= Outline of technology =

Overview of and topical guide to technology

The following outline is provided as an overview of and topical guide to technology:

Technology – collection of tools, including machinery, modifications, arrangements and procedures used by humans. Engineering is the discipline that seeks to study and design new technology. Technologies significantly affect human as well as other animal species' ability to control and adapt to their natural environments.

== Components of technology ==
- Knowledge – Awareness of facts, or competency (outline)
  - Engineering – Applied science and research (outline)
  - Process – Series of activities
  - Science – Systematic endeavour to gain knowledge (outline)
  - Skill – Ability to carry out a task
- Tool – Object used to achieve a goal
  - Weapon – Implement or device used to inflict damage, harm, or kill
  - Utensil – Tool used for food preparation
  - Equipment – Items required to exercise a certain activity
  - Invention – Novel device, material or technical process
  - Machinery – Powered mechanical device
    - Outline of automation
    - Outline of industrial machinery
    - Outline of machines
- Structure – Arrangement of interrelated elements in an object/system, or the object/system itself
  - Building – Enclosed structure
  - Road – Land route
  - Bridge – Structure built to span physical obstacles
  - Canal – Artificial channel for water
  - Dam – Barrier that stops or restricts the flow of surface or underground streams
  - Man-made systems – Interrelated entities that form a whole
- Infrastructure – Facilities and systems serving society
  - Public utility – Entity which operates public service infrastructure

== Branches of technology ==
- Aerospace – flight or transport above the surface of the Earth.
  - Space exploration – the physical investigation of the space more than 100 km above the Earth by either crewed or uncrewed spacecraft.
  - General aviation
  - Aeronautics
  - Astronautics
  - Aerospace engineering
- Applied physics – physics which is intended for a particular technological or practical use. It is usually considered as a bridge or a connection between "pure" physics and engineering.
- Agriculture – cultivation of plants, animals, and other living organisms.
  - Fishing – activity of trying to catch fish. Fish are normally caught in the wild. Techniques for catching fish include hand gathering, spearing, netting, angling and trapping.
    - Fisheries – a fishery is an entity engaged in raising or harvesting fish which is determined by some authority to be a fishery. According to the FAO, a fishery is typically defined in terms of the "people involved, species or type of fish, area of water or seabed, method of fishing, class of boats, purpose of the activities or a combination of the foregoing features".
    - Fishing industry – industry or activity concerned with taking, culturing, processing, preserving, storing, transporting, marketing or selling fish or fish products. It is defined by the FAO as including recreational, subsistence and commercial fishing, and the harvesting, processing, and marketing sectors.
  - Forestry – art and science of tree resources, including plantations and natural stands. The main goal of forestry is to create and implement systems that allow forests to continue a sustainable provision of environmental supplies and services.
  - Organic gardening and farming
  - Sustainable agriculture
- Communication
  - Books
  - Telecommunication – the transfer of information at a distance, including signaling, telegraphy, telephony, telemetry, radio, television, and data communications.
    - Radio – Aural or encoded telecommunications.
    - Internet – the global system of interconnected computer networks that use the standard Internet Protocol Suite (TCP/IP).
    - Technology of television
      - Television broadcasting – Visual and aural telecommunications.
- Computing – any goal-oriented activity requiring, benefiting from, or creating computers. Computing includes designing and building hardware and software systems; processing, structuring, and managing various kinds of information; doing scientific research on and with computers; making computer systems behave intelligently; creating and using communications and entertainment media; and more.
  - Computer engineering – discipline that integrates several fields of electrical engineering and computer science required to develop computer systems, from designing individual microprocessors, personal computers, and supercomputers, to circuit design.
    - Computers – general purpose devices that can be programmed to carry out a finite set of arithmetic or logical operations. Since a sequence of operations can be readily changed, computers can solve more than one kind of problem.
  - Computer science – the study of the theoretical foundations of information and computation and of practical techniques for their implementation and application in computer systems.
    - Artificial intelligence – intelligence of machines and the branch of computer science that aims to create it.
      - Natural language processing
      - Object recognition – in computer vision, this is the task of finding a given object in an image or video sequence.
    - Cryptography – the technology to secure communications in the presence of third parties.
    - Human-computer interaction
  - Information technology – the acquisition, processing, storage and dissemination of vocal, pictorial, textual and numerical information by a microelectronics-based combination of computing and telecommunications.
  - Software engineering – the systematic approach to the development, operation, maintenance, and retirement of computer software.
    - Programming – the process of designing, writing, testing, debugging, and maintaining the source code of computer programs.
    - Software development – development of a software product, which entails computer programming (process of writing and maintaining the source code), but also encompasses a planned and structured process from the conception of the desired software to its final manifestation.
    - Web design and web development
  - Software – one or more computer programs and data held in the storage of the computer for one or more purposes. In other words, software is a set of programs, procedures, algorithms and its documentation concerned with the operation of a data processing system.
    - Free software – software that can be used, studied, and modified without restriction.
    - Search engines – information retrieval systems designed to help find information stored on a computer system.
  - Internet – the global system of interconnected computer networks that use the standard Internet Protocol Suite (TCP/IP).
    - World Wide Web
  - Computer industry
    - Apple Inc. – manufacturer and retailer of computers, hand-held computing devices, and related products and services.
    - Google – Google Inc. and its Internet services including Google Search.
- Construction – building or assembly of any physical structure.
- Design – the art and science of creating the abstract form and function for an object or environment.
  - Architecture – the art and science of designing buildings.
- Electronics – Electronics comprises the physics, engineering, technology and applications that deal with the emission, flow and control of electrons in vacuum and matter.
- Energy – In physics, energy is the quantitative property that must be transferred to an object in order to perform work on, or to heat, the object.
  - Energy development – ongoing effort to provide abundant, efficient, and accessible energy resources through knowledge, skills, and construction.
  - Energy storage – the storage of a form of energy that can then be used later.
  - Nuclear technology – the technology and application of the spontaneous and induced reactions of atomic nuclei.
  - Wind energy – wind energy is the use of wind to provide the mechanical power through wind turbines to turn electric generators and traditionally to do other work, like milling or pumping.
  - Solar energy – Solar energy is radiant light and heat from the Sun that is harnessed using a range of ever-evolving technologies such as solar heating, photovoltaics, solar thermal energy, solar architecture, molten salt power plants and artificial photosynthesis.
- Engineering – the application of science, mathematics, and technology to produce useful goods and systems.
  - Chemical engineering – the technology and application of chemical processes to produce useful materials.
  - Computer engineering – Computer engineering (CE) is a branch of engineering that integrates several fields of computer science and electronic engineering required to develop computer hardware and software.
  - Control engineering – Control engineering or control systems engineering is an engineering discipline that applies automatic control theory to design systems with desired behaviors in control environments.
  - Electrical engineering – the technology and application of electromagnetism, including electricity, electronics, telecommunications, computers, electric power, magnetics, and optics.
  - Climate engineering – the large-scale manipulation of a specific process central to controlling Earth's climate for the purpose of obtaining a specific benefit.
  - Software engineering – the technology and application of a systematic approach to the development, operation, maintenance, and retirement of computer software.
- Firefighting – act of extinguishing fires. A firefighter fights fires to prevent destruction of life, property and the environment. Firefighting is a professional technical skill.
- Forensic science – application of a broad spectrum of sciences to answer questions of interest to a legal system. This may be in relation to a crime or a civil action.
- Health
  - Biotechnology – applied biology that involves the use of living organisms and bioprocesses in engineering, technology, medicine and other fields requiring bioproducts.
  - Ergonomics – the study of designing equipment and devices that fit the human body, its movements, and its cognitive abilities.
- Hydrology – The study of the movement, distribution, and quality of water on Earth and other planets, including the hydrologic cycle, water resources and environmental watershed sustainability.
- Industry – production of an economic good or service.
  - Automation – use of machinery to replace human labor.
  - Industrial machinery
  - Machines – devices that perform or assist in performing useful work.
  - Manufacturing – use of machines, tools and labor to produce goods for use or sale. The term may refer to a range of human activity, from handicraft to high tech, but is most commonly applied to industrial production, in which raw materials are transformed into finished goods on a large scale.
  - Robotics – deals with the design, construction, operation, structural disposition, manufacture and application of robots.
    - Object recognition
- Information science
  - Cartography – the study and practice of making maps. Combining science, aesthetics, and technique, cartography builds on the premise that reality can be modeled in ways that communicate spatial information effectively.
  - Library science – technology related to libraries and the information fields.
- Military science – the study of the technique, psychology, practice and other phenomena which constitute war and armed conflict.
- Mining – extraction of mineral resources from the earth.
- Nanotechnology – The study of manipulating matter on an atomic and molecular scale. Generally, nanotechnology deals with structures sized between 1 and 100 nanometre in at least one dimension, and involves developing materials or devices possessing at least one dimension within that size.
- Prehistoric technology – technologies that emerged before recorded history (i.e., before the development of writing).
- Quantum technology
- Sustainability – capacity to endure. In ecology, the word describes how biological systems remain diverse and productive over time. Long-lived and healthy wetlands and forests are examples of sustainable biological systems. For humans, sustainability is the potential for long-term maintenance of well-being, which has environmental, economic, and social dimensions.
- Transport – the transfer of people or things from one place to another.
  - Rail transport – means of conveyance of passengers and goods by way of wheeled vehicles running on rail tracks consisting of steel rails installed on sleepers/ties and ballast.
  - Vehicles – mechanical devices for transporting people or things.
    - Automobiles – human-guided powered land-vehicles.
    - Bicycles – human-powered land-vehicles with two or more wheels.
    - Motorcycles – single-track, engine-powered, motor vehicles. They are also called motorbikes, bikes, or cycles.
    - Vehicle components
      - Tires – ring-shaped coverings that fit around wheel rims

== Technology by region ==
- Science and technology in Africa
  - Science and technology in Morocco
  - Science and technology in South Africa
- Science and technology in Asia
  - Science and technology in Bangladesh
  - Science and technology in China
  - Science and technology in India
  - Science and technology in Indonesia
  - Science and technology in Iran
  - Science and technology in Israel
  - Science and technology in Japan
  - Science and technology in Malaysia
  - Science and technology in Pakistan
  - Science and technology in the Philippines
  - Science and technology in Russia
  - Science and technology in Turkey
- Science and technology in Europe
  - Science and technology in Albania
  - Science and technology in Belgium
    - Science and technology in Brussels
    - Science and technology in Flanders
    - Science and technology in Wallonia
  - Science and technology in Bulgaria
  - Science and technology in France
  - Science and technology in Germany
  - Science and technology in Hungary
  - Science and technology in Iceland
  - Science and technology in Italy
  - Science and technology in Portugal
  - Science and technology in Romania
  - Science and technology in Russia
  - Science and technology in Spain
  - Science and technology in Switzerland
  - Science and technology in Ukraine
  - Science and technology in the United Kingdom
- Science and technology in North America
  - Science and technology in Canada
  - Science and technology in the United States
  - Science and technology in Jamaica
- Science and technology in South America
  - Science and technology in Argentina
  - Science and technology in Colombia
  - Science and technology in Venezuela

== History of technology ==
History of technology

- Timelines of technology
- Man vs. Technology
- Technology museum

=== History of technology by period ===
- Prehistoric technology (outline)
  - Control of fire by early humans
- Ancient technology – c. 800 BCE – 476 CE
  - Ancient Egyptian technology
  - Ancient Greek technology – c. 800 BCE – 146 BCE
  - Ancient Roman technology – c. 753 BCE – 476 CE
  - Science and technology of the Han dynasty – 206 BCE – 220 CE
  - Science and technology of the Tang dynasty – 618–907
- Science and technology of the Song dynasty – 960–1279 CE
- Medieval technology – 5th to 15th century
  - Byzantine technology – 5th to 15th century
- Islamic Golden Age – 8th to 13th century
- Science and technology in the Ottoman Empire – 14th to 20th century
- Industrial Revolution – 18th to 19th century
- Second Industrial Revolution – 1820–1914
- Technology during World War I – 1914–1918
- Technology during World War II – 1939–1945
  - Allied technological cooperation during World War II
  - American military technology during World War II
  - German military technology during World War II
- 1970s in science and technology
- 1980s in science and technology
- 1990s in science and technology
- 2000s in science and technology
- 2010s in science and technology

==== Technological ages ====
- Stone Age – Prehistoric period before metal tools
- Bronze Age – Historical period (c. 3300–1200 BCE)
- Iron Age – Archaeological period
- The Renaissance – European cultural period of the 14th to 17th centuries
- Industrial Age – Period of human history from the mid 18th to late 20th centuries
- Information Age – Industrial shift to information technology

=== Media about the history of technology ===
- Connections – documentary television series and 1978 book ("Connections" based on the series) created, written, and presented by science historian James Burke. It took an interdisciplinary approach to the history of science and invention and demonstrated how various discoveries, scientific achievements, and historical world events were built from one another successively in an interconnected way to bring about particular aspects of modern technology. There were 3 seasons produced, and they aired in 1978, 1994, and 1997.
- The Day the Universe Changed – documentary television series written and presented by science historian James Burke, originally broadcast in 1985 by the BBC. The series' primary focus is on the effect of advances in science and technology on western society in its philosophical aspects. Ran for one season, in 1986.

=== History of technology by region ===
- History of science and technology in the Mediterranean
  - Ancient Greek technology
  - Ancient Roman technology
  - Timeline of Polish science and technology
- History of science and technology in Africa
- History of science and technology in Asia
  - History of science and technology in China
    - Science and technology of the Han dynasty
    - Science and technology of the Tang dynasty
    - Science and technology of the Song dynasty
    - History of science and technology in the People's Republic of China
  - History of science and technology in the Indian subcontinent
    - Science and technology in ancient India
  - History of science and technology in Korea
  - Science and Technology in the Ottoman Empire
  - Science and technology in the Soviet Union
- History of science and technology in North America
  - United States technological and industrial history
  - History of science and technology in Mexico
- Technological and industrial history of Canada
  - Technological and industrial history of 20th-century Canada
  - Technological and industrial history of 21st-century Canada
- Technological and industrial history of the People's Republic of China
- Technological and industrial history of the United States

=== History of technology by field ===
- History of invention
- History of aerospace
- History of artificial intelligence
- History of agriculture
- History of agricultural science
- History of architecture, timeline
- History of biotechnology
- History of cartography
- History of chemical engineering
- History of communication
  - History of computing, timeline
  - History of computer science
  - History of computing hardware
  - History of the graphical user interface
  - History of hypertext, timeline
  - History of the Internet, Internet phenomena
    - History of the World Wide Web
  - History of operating systems
  - History of programming languages, timeline
  - History of software engineering
- History of electrical engineering
- History of energy development
- History of engineering
- History of industry
- History of library and information science
- History of microscopy
- History of manufacturing
  - History of the factory
  - History of mass production
- History of materials science, timeline
- History of measurement
- History of medicine
- History of motor and engine technology
- History of military science
- History of transport, timeline
- History of display technology
- History of film technology
- History of information technology auditing
- History of military technology
- History of nanotechnology
- History of science and technology
- History of web syndication technology

==== Timeline ====
- Timeline of agriculture and food technology
- Timeline of biotechnology
- Timeline of clothing and textiles technology
- Timeline of communication technology
- Timeline of diving technology
- Timeline of heat engine technology
- Timeline of hypertext technology
- Timeline of lighting technology
- Timeline of low-temperature technology
- Timeline of materials technology
- Timeline of medicine and medical technology
- Timeline of microscope technology
- Timeline of motor and engine technology
- Timeline of particle physics technology
- Timeline of photography technology
- Timeline of rocket and missile technology
- Timeline of telescope technology
- Timeline of telescopes, observatories, and observing technology
- Timeline of temperature and pressure measurement technology
- Timeline of time measurement technology
- Timeline of transportation technology

== Hypothetical technology ==
Potential technology of the future includes:

Hypothetical technology

- Femtotechnology – hypothetical term used in reference to structuring of matter on the scale of a femtometer, which is 10−15 m. This is a smaller scale in comparison to nanotechnology and picotechnology which refer to 10−9 m and 10−12 m respectively. Work in the femtometer range involves manipulation of excited energy states within atomic nuclei (see nuclear isomer) to produce metastable (or otherwise stabilized) states with unusual properties.

== Philosophy of technology ==
- Appropriate technology – Concept in the philosophy and politics of technology
- Instrumental and intrinsic value – Philosophical concept
- Jacques Ellul – French anarchist philosopher (1912–1994)
- Paradigm – Set of distinct concepts or thought patterns
- Posthumanism – Class of philosophies
  - Posthuman – Person or entity that exists in a state beyond being human
- Precautionary principle – Risk management strategy
- Singularitarianism – Belief in an incipient technological singularity
- Techno-progressivism – Stance of active support for the convergence of technological and social change
- Technocentrism – Value system centered on technology
- Technocracy – Form of government ruled by experts
- Technocriticism – Branch of critical theory
- Technological determinism – Reductionist theory
- Ethics of technology – Ethical questions specific to the technology age
- Technological evolution – Theory describing technology development
- Techno-nationalism – Way of understanding how technology affects the society and culture of a nation
- Technological singularity – Hypothetical event
- Technology readiness level – Method for estimating the maturity of technologies
- Technorealism – Attempt to expand the middle ground between techno-utopianism and Neo-Luddism
- Theories of technology – Factors that shape technological innovation
- Transhumanism – Philosophical movement
  - FM-2030 – Transhumanist and futurist (1930–2000)
- High tech – Most advanced technology available
- Kardashev scale – Measure of a civilization's evolution
- Bioconservatism – Cautious stance towards modifying human nature

== Strategy of technology ==
- Human enhancement – Natural, artificial, or technological alteration of the human body
  - Cyborg – Being with both organic and biomechatronic body parts
  - Global brain – Futuristic concept of a global interconnected network
  - Brain–computer interface – Connection between brain and computer
  - Life extension – Concept of extending human lifespan
- Science – Systematic endeavour to gain knowledge
- Technology – Use of knowledge for practical goals
- Technology management – Design and control of technology products
- Technology integration – Use of technology to aid education
- Technology intelligence
- Technology life cycle – Development, ascent, maturity, and decline of new technologies
- Technology roadmap – Planning technique

=== Advancement of technology ===
- DARPA – Technology research and development agency of the U.S. Department of Defense
- Emerging technologies – Technology still to be fully developed
  - List of emerging technologies – New technologies actively in development
- Horizon scanning – Methodology in futures studies
- Hypothetical technology – Technology that does not exist yet
- Innovation – Practical implementation of improvements
- Invention – Novel device, material or technical process
- Inventor – Novel device, material or technical process
- Research and development – General term for activities in connection with corporate or governmental innovation
- Technological superpowers – State with extensive power or influence over much of the world
- Technological transitions – Describes how technological innovations occur and are incorporated into society

== Politics of technology ==
Politics and technology

- AI takeover
- Accelerating change
- Format war
- Information privacy
- IT law
- PEST analysis
- Robot rights
- Technological singularity
- Technological sovereignty

== Economics of technology ==
- Energy accounting
- Nanosocialism
- Post-scarcity economy
- Technocracy
- Technocapitalism
- Technological change
- Technological diffusion
- Technology acceptance model
- Technology lifecycle
- Technology transfer

== Technology education ==
- Technology education

=== Technology museums ===
- Technoseum – Technology museum in Mannheim, Germany

== Science and technology think tanks ==
- Battelle Memorial Institute
- Cicada 3301
- Council for Scientific and Industrial Research
- Edge Foundation, Inc.
- Eudoxa
- Federation of American Scientists
- Free Software Foundation
- GTRI Office of Policy Analysis and Research
- Information Technology and Innovation Foundation
- Institute for Science and International Security
- Institute for the Encouragement of Scientific Research and Innovation of Brussels
- Keck Institute for Space Studies
- Kestrel Institute
- Malaysian Industry-Government Group for High Technology
- Pakistan Council of Scientific and Industrial Research
- Piratbyrån
- RAND Corporation
- Regional Center for Renewable Energy and Energy Efficiency
- Res4Med
- Richard Dawkins Foundation for Reason and Science
- Swecha
- Wau Holland Foundation

== Technology media ==
For historical treatments, see Media about the history of technology, above

- Technology journalism

=== Books on technology ===
- Engines of Creation

=== Technology periodicals ===
- Engadget
- TechCrunch
- Wired

=== Websites ===
- The Verge

=== Fictional technology ===
Fictional technology

- In Death technology
- Technology in Star Trek
- Technology in Star Wars
- Technology of Robotech
- List of technology in the Dune universe

== Persons influential in technology ==
- List of engineers
- List of inventors
- List of scientists

== See also ==
- Outline of applied science

== Miscellaneous topics ==
Note: these topics need to be placed in the outline above. Some may be irrelevant and those should be removed. New sections may be needed in the outline to provide a suitable place for some of these items. Annotations by way of short descriptions may help decide where a link should go.

- Acoustic resonance technology – Inspection technology for measuring thickness
- Advanced steam technology – Evolution of steam power beyond mainstream mid-20th-century implementations
- Applications of nanotechnology – Uses for technology on very small scales
- Architectural technology – Application of technology to the design and architecture of buildings
- Assisted reproductive technology – Methods to achieve pregnancy by artificial or partially artificial means
  - Artificial womb – Device for artificial gestation
- Assistive technology – Assistive devices for people with disabilities
- Assistive technology in sport
- Automatic box-opening technology – Mechanical process
- Barcode technology in healthcare
- Baseball telecasts technology – Chronological list
- Bead probe technology – Technique used for in-circuit testing
- Beam lead technology – Technology used to deposit metal beams onto integrated circuits for connecting them
- Biomedical technology
- Bionics – Application of natural systems to technology
- Prosthesis – Artificial device that replaces a missing body part
- Implant – Device surgically placed within the body for medical purposes
- Bleeding edge technology – Technology still to be fully developed
- Braille technology – Type of assistive technology
- Brain technology – Neuroscience-based adaptive systems
- CASY cell counting technology – Cell counting system
- Calm technology – Type of information technology
- Ceramic mixing technology
- BOINC client–server technology – BOINC volunteer computing client–server structure
- Chirotechnology – Separation of a sample of a chiral compound into its enantiomers
- Circuit rider (technology) – Technology assistance organization for non-profits
- Civic technology – How government use of telecom and computers interacts with the people
- Clean coal technology – Combustible sedimentary rock composed primarily of carbon
- Clean technology – Any process, product, or service that reduces negative environmental impacts
- Close coupled field technology
- Clothing technology – Technology involving the manufacturing and innovation of clothing materials
- Coal upgrading technology – Solid fossil fuel
- Community technology
- Computer technology for developing areas – Donation of technology to developing areas
- Construction collaboration technology
- Contesting technology – Tools for amateur radio sport
- Cultural technology – South Korean media marketing system
- Cycling probe technology
- Cytotechnology – Microscopic interpretation of cells to detect cancer and other abnormalities
- DNA nanotechnology – Design and manufacture of artificial nucleic acid structures
- Dance technology – Application of information technology application of modern information technology in activities related to dance: in dance education, choreography, performance, and research.
- Demand flow technology – Strategy for business processes
- Design technology – Use of technology for product design
- Digital newspaper technology
- Digital scent technology – Study of smelling things through a computer
- Domestic technology – Usage of applied science in houses
- Downhole oil–water separation technology
- Dual-use technology – Technology that can be used for both peaceful and military purposes
- Dynamic video memory technology
- Ecotechnology – Technology causing minimal ecological harm
- Educational technology – Use of technology in education to enhance learning and teaching
- Electric transportation technology – Vehicle propelled fully or mostly by electricity
- Electrical engineering technology
- Electrofluidic display technology – Paper-like display technology
- Electron-beam technology – Devices using beams of free electrons
- Electrothermal-chemical technology – Plasma ignition of projectile propellent
- Enabling technology
- Energy applications of nanotechnology
- Energy security and renewable technology – Renewable technologies contributions to energy security
- Energy technology – Methods bringing energy into production
- Entertainment technology
- Environmental biotechnology – Biotechnology applied to the natural environment
- Environmental technology – Technical and technological processes for protection of the environment
- Expandable tubular technology
- Field-induced polymer electroluminescent technology – Electroluminescent light source
- Food technology – Academic discipline regarding the preparation of foods
- Frame technology (software engineering) – System manufacturing custom software
- G-Technology – Professional storage products by Sandisk and Western Digital
- General-purpose technology – Technologies that can affect an entire economy at large scale
- Genetic engineering – Manipulation of an organism's genome
  - Genetic use restriction technology – Methods for controlling the use of GMOs
- Germinal choice technology – Liberal use of reprogenetics in human enhancement
- Gerontechnology – Academic and professional field
- Goal-line technology – Electronic aid to determine if a goal has been scored in association football
- Green nanotechnology – Environmentally-oriented nanotechnology
- Greenfish recirculation technology
- Group technology – Manufacturing technique
- Gustatory technology – Engineering discipline dealing with gustatory representation
- Haptic technology – Interaction involving touch
- Headspace technology – Technique of gas chromatography
- Health information technology – Information technology applied to health and health care
- Health technology – Application of organized knowledge and skills to solve health problems
- Heart nanotechnology – Application of molecular-scale engineering to heart medicine
- High-technology swimwear fabric – Scientifically advanced materials used for swimwear
- Holiday lighting technology – Decorative lighting for festivities
- Human performance technology – Field ofstudy
- Hurdle technology – Food production safety method
- Hybridoma technology – Method for producing lots of identical antibodies
- Hyper-interactive teaching technology – Type of interaction
- Hypoxic air technology for fire prevention
- Imaging technology – Representation or reproduction of an object's form
- Immersive technology – Perception of being physically present in a non-physical world
- Induction plasma technology – Type of high temperature plasma generated by electromagnetic induction
- Industrial technology – Use of technology to increase the efficiency of production
- Information and communications technology – Extensional term for information technology
- Information and communications technology in Kosovo
- Information processing technology and aging
- Information technology – Computer-based technologies
  - Virtual reality – Computer-simulated experience
- Internet services technology
- IsaKidd refining technology
- Keyboard technology – Hardware technology of keyboards
- Language technology
- Large-screen television technology – Technology rapidly developed in the late 1990s and 2000s
- Lithic technology – Ancient production techniques
- Low technology – Simple technology
- Marine technology – Technologies used in marine environments
- Mature technology
- Mechanical engineering technology
- Membrane technology – Transport of substances between two fractions with the help of permeable membranes
- Metamaterials surface antenna technology – Class of antennas
- Microblade technology – Period of technological development
- Microtechnology – Technology with features near one micrometre
- Military technology – Application of technology for use in warfare
- Mobile technology – Technology used for cellular communication
- Molecular nanotechnology
- Music instrument technology – Device for making musical sounds
- Music technology – Use of technology by musicians
- NX technology – Desktop virtualization and application delivery software
- Nana technology – Microchip-based technology for aiding older adults
- Nanobiotechnology – Intersection of nanotechnology and biology
- Nanotechnology – Technology with features near one nanometer
- Near-infrared signature management technology – Camouflage designed to work at multiple frequencies, not just visible light
- Neurotechnology – Technology that interfaces with the nervous system to monitor or modify neural function
- Non-profit technology – Technology used by non-profit organizations
- Nuclear technology – Technology that involves the reactions of atomic nuclei
- Omniview technology
- Open-source-appropriate technology – Appropriate technology from the open-design movement
- Orphaned technology – Technology abandoned by the original developers
- Orthodontic technology – Specialty of dental technology
- Particle technology – Science of the processing of particles and powders
- Performance acceleration technology
- Persuasive technology – Technology designed to persuade
- Phage-ligand technology
- Phonetic search technology
- Photoimageable thick-film technology
- Phytotechnology – Decontamination technique using living plants
- Picotechnology – Technology with features near one picometer
- Plasma deep drilling technology
- Point-to-point laser technology
- Positioning technology – Technology for determining an object's location in space
- Presentation technology – Tools used for conveying information
- Primatte chromakey technology
- Process analytical technology – Type of technology
- Pull technology – Style of network communication where requests are sent by the client
- Pumpable ice technology – Type of technology to produce and use fluids or secondary refrigerants
- Push technology – Method of network communication where requests are sent by the publisher
- Quantum technology – Technological development using the laws of quantum mechanics
- Radio access technology – Physical connection method for a radio communication network
- Rapid transit technology – High-capacity public transport
- Reproductive technology – Uses of technology in human and animal reproduction
- Resolution enhancement technology – Printing technology
- Rotary technology
- Rubber technology
- Search engine technology – System to help searching for information
- Self-drying concrete technology
- Semantic technology – Technology to help machines understand data
- Site-specific recombinase technology – Genome engineering tools
- Social technology – Technology that enables social interactions
- Soft energy technology – Simple designs reliant on renewables
- Space technology – Technology developed for use in Space exploration
- Speech technology
- Stealth technology – Military technology to make personnel and material less visible
- Subsea (technology) – Technology of submerged operations in the sea
- Surface-mount technology – Method for producing electronic circuits
- Suspension array technology
- Tamper-evident technology – Device or process that makes unauthorized access to the protected object easily detected
- Telepresence technology – Technology used in deep sea exploration
- Tennis technology – Technological advance in tennis
- Terahertz spectroscopy and technology – Molecule investigation technique
- Terotechnology – Engineering term
- Thick film technology – Technology used to produce electronic components
- Thick-film dielectric electroluminescent technology – Optical and electrical phenomenon
- Through-hole technology – Circuit board manufacturing technique
- Time release technology – Mechanism that delivers a drug with a delay after its administration
- Travel technology – Use of IT or ICT in the travel industry
- Trenchless technology – Underground construction that minimizes surface disruption
- Use of technology in treatment of mental disorders
- Vehicle safety technology – Special technology developed to ensure the safety and security of automobiles
- Video sensor technology
- Visual technology
- Wearable technology – Clothing and accessories incorporating computer and advanced electronic technologies
- Wet nanotechnology
- Wire rope spooling technology – Technology to prevent wire rope getting snagged when spooled on a drum
- Workflow technology
- X-Wind technology – Form of wind-powered mechanical or electrical generation
- Xpress technology
- Advanced technology – Most advanced technology available
- Appropriate technology – Concept in the philosophy and politics of technology
- Alternative technology – Term refers to environmentally-friendly technologies
- Al Gore and information technology
- Assistive technology service provider
- Best available technology – Approved environmental solutions
- Biotechnology and genetic engineering in Bangladesh
- Biotechnology consulting
- Biotechnology industry in China
- Brazilian science and technology
- Buddhist influences on print technology
- Bullying in information technology – Form of workplace bullying
- Chief technology officer – Officer in charge of technical operations
- Community technology center – Public place where people can access digital technologies
- Comparison of display technology
- Competitions and prizes in biotechnology
- Consumer adoption of technological innovations
- Corporate governance of information technology – Subset discipline of corporate governance
- Critique of technology
- Democratization of technology – Spread and access to technology
- Differential technological development – Strategy of technology governance
- Directive on the legal protection of biotechnological inventions – European Union directive in the field of patent law
- Drexler–Smalley debate on molecular nanotechnology
- Economic and Technological Development Zones – Zones in China for foreign direct investment
- Educational technology in Saudi Arabia
- Ethics of technology – Ethical questions specific to the technology age
- Environmental impact of nanotechnology
- Etiquette in technology – Code of behavior for use of the Internet
- Fail-safes in nanotechnology
- Glossary of legal terms in technology
- Goans in science and technology
- Health impact of nanotechnology
- Health technology assessment – Field of policy analysis
- Hydrogen energy vision and technology roadmap – Chinese government plan
- Impact of nanotechnology
- Industrial applications of nanotechnology
- Information technology architecture
- Information technology audit – Examination of an information system
- Information technology consulting – Field that focuses on advising businesses on how best to use information technology
- Information technology controls
- Information technology in Bangladesh
- Information technology in India
- Information technology in Morocco
- Information technology in Pakistan
- Information technology management
- Information technology operations – Planning and operation of data centers
- Information technology outsourcing – Contracting internal tasks to an external organization
- Information technology planning
- Information technology security audit – Independent examination of knowledge protection mechanisms
- Information technology specialist – United States Army Positions
- Instrumental conception of technology – Philosophical concept
- Investment-specific technological progress – Investment in new equipment
- List of DNA nanotechnology research groups
- List of United States technological universities
- List of advertising technology companies
- List of archaic technological nomenclature
- List of atheists in science and technology
- List of biotechnology companies
- List of computer technology code names
- List of cultural, intellectual, philosophical and technological revolutions
- List of information technology acronyms
- List of institutions using the term "institute of technology" or "polytechnic"
- List of nanotechnology organizations
- List of philosophers of technology
- List of science and technology articles by continent
- List of steam technology patents
- List of technology centers
- List of largest technology companies by revenue
- Marx's notebooks on the history of technology
- Medical technology assessment
- Mobile technology in Africa
- Muslim women in science and technology
- Nanotechnology education – Learning and teaching related to nanotechnology
- Nanotechnology in fiction – Fictional uses of nanotechnology
- Next generation of display technology – Type of display technology
- Operations and technology management
- Participatory technology development
- Radio and television technology in Turkey
- Regulation of nanotechnology
- Religious response to assisted reproductive technology – Challenges for traditional communities
- Response time (technology) – Time a given technological system takes to respond to an input
- Science, technology and society – Academic field
- Science, technology, society and environment education
- Sexism in the technology industry
- Social construction of technology – Theory in science and technology studies
- Social shaping of technology
- Societal impact of nanotechnology
- Technological alliance
- Technological apartheid
- Technological applications of superconductivity
- Technological change – Process of invention, innovation and diffusion of technology or processes
- Technological convergence – Aspect of technological change
- Technological determinism – Reductionist theory
- Technological dualism
- Technological escalation
- Technological evolution – Theory describing technology development
- Technological fix – Attempt at using engineering or technology to solve a problem
- Technological history of the Roman military
- Technological innovation system
- Technological momentum
- Technological nationalism – Way of understanding how technology affects the society and culture of a nation
- Technological paradigm – Technological stage
- Technological rationality – Philosophical idea
- Technological revolution – Period of rapid technological change
- Technological self-efficacy
- Technological singularity – Hypothetical event
- Technological somnambulism
- Technological studies – School subject taught in Scotland
- Technological theory of social production
- Technological transitions – Describes how technological innovations occur and are incorporated into society
- Technological unemployment – Unemployment caused by technological change
- Technological utopianism – Any ideology based on the premise that advances in technology could bring a utopia
- Technology acceptance model – Information systems theory
- Technology adoption lifecycle – Sociological model
- Technology alignment
- Technology and Construction Court – Division of the English High Court of Justice
- Technology and Culture
- Technology and Entertainment Software – Video game brand
- Technology and Livelihood Education – Learning area of the Philippine curriculum
- Technology and society
- Technology and the Character of Contemporary Life: A Philosophical Inquiry
- Technology assessment – Determining the value of a new technology
- Technology aware design
- Technology brokering
- Technology company – Company focused on technology
- Technology demonstration – Showcasing an idea for new technology
- Technology doping – Practice of gaining a competitive advantage using sports equipment
- Technology dynamics – Scientific field
- Technology education – Education in processes and use of technology
- Technology evangelist – Person who gains significant acclaim for a given technology
- Technology for Improved Learning Outcomes
- Technology for peace
- Technology forecasting – Predicting the future of technology
- Technology gap – International trade theory
- Technology governance – Governance of the development of technology
- Technology policy – Form of policy
- Technology readiness level – Method for estimating the maturity of technologies
- Technology roadmap – Planning technique
- Technology scouting – Element of technology management
- Technology shock
- Technology stack – Set of software subsystems or components needed to create a complete platform
- Technology strategy – Strategy of technology use
- Technology support net
- Technology trajectory
- Technology-enhanced active learning
- Technology transfer – Process of disseminating technology
- Technology transfer in computer science – Subclass of technology transfer
- Technology treadmill
- Technology tree – Diagram used in strategy computer games
- Unified theory of acceptance and use of technology – Information systems user theory
- The Beatles' recording technology
- Technology CAD – Branch of electronic design automation
- Techno-lodge – Type of business park in India
- Techno-progressivism – Stance of active support for the convergence of technological and social change
- Techno-thriller – Thriller sub-genre with high level of technical detail
- Technoavia – Russian aircraft manufacturer
- Technobabble – Jargon-sounding nonsense
- Technobots
- Technoboy – Italian hardstyle DJ (born 1970)
- Technocapitalism – Changes in capitalism associated with the emergence of new technology sectors
- Technocentrism – Value system centered on technology
- Technocosmos
- Technocracy – Form of government ruled by experts
- Technocracy movement – 1930s North American social movement
- Technocrane – Telescopic camera crane
- Technocriticism – Branch of critical theory
- Technoculture – Neologism
- Technodelic
- Technodiktator
- Technodon – 1993 studio album by Yellow Magic Orchestra
- Technoetic
- Technofile
- Technoflash – 1972 Canadian TV series
- Technogaianism – Favor of technology to fight environmental threats
- Technographic segmentation
- Technogypsie
- Technolangue/Easy – French syntactic parsing project
- Technoliberalism – Political ideology
- Technolibertarianism – Techno-political ideology rejecting all forms of government regulation
- Technologic – 2005 song by Daft Punk
- Technologie – American alternative rock band
- Technometrics
- Technomimetics
- Technopaganism – Merging of neopaganism and magical ritual with digital technologies
- Technoparade – Parade of vehicles playing electronic dance music
- Technophilia – Strong enthusiasm for technology
- Technophobia – Fear or discomfort with technology
- Technophoby – Canadian musical project
- Technopoly – 1992 book by Neil Postman
- Technorealism – Attempt to expand the middle ground between techno-utopianism and Neo-Luddism
- Technoromanticism – Human evolution
- Technoscience – Study of how technology and science interact
- Technoself – Human identity in a technological society
- Technosexual – Male personality type
- Technosignature – Property that provides scientific evidence for the presence of technology
- Technostress – Stress caused by technology
- Technostructure – Bureaucrats who shape an organisations's economy
- Technothlon – School championship in India
- Technozion – Engineering institute in Warangal, India
- Nootropic – Compound intended to improve cognitive function
