= Alexander Sanchez =

Alexander Sanchez may refer to:

- Alexander Sánchez (born 1984), Peruvian footballer
- Alexander Sanchez, member of the Swedish Eudoxa think-tank
- Alexander Sanchez, Men's Elite Road Race Champion of Costa Rica in the 2008 national cycling championships
