= List of philosophers of technology =

This is a list of philosophers of technology. It includes philosophers from other disciplines who are recognised as having made an important contribution to the field, for example those commonly included in reference anthologies.

== A–C ==
- Hans Achterhuis
- Alison Adam
- Günther Anders
- Hannah Arendt
- Aristotle
- Joxe Azurmendi
- Francis Bacon
- Jean Baudrillard
- Seth Baum
- Anthony Beavers
- Walter Benjamin
- Bernadette Bensaude-Vincent
- Albert Borgmann
- Nick Bostrom
- Joanna Bryson
- Mario Bunge
- Manuel Castells
- David Chalmers
- Wendy Hui Kyong Chun
- Mark Coeckelbergh
- Kate Crawford

== D–G ==
- Paul Davies
- John Dewey
- Hubert Dreyfus
- Jacques Ellul
- Andrew Feenberg
- Michel Foucault
- Luciano Floridi
- Ursula Franklin
- Alexander R. Galloway
- Marina Gržinić
- Aldous Huxley

== H–L ==
- Jürgen Habermas
- Byung-Chul Han
- Donna Haraway
- Martin Heidegger
- Eric Higgs
- Yuk Hui
- Don Ihde
- Harold Innis
- Lucas Introna
- Sheila Jasanoff
- Karl Jaspers
- Hans Jonas
- Ernst Kapp
- Nicole C. Karafyllis
- Douglas Kellner
- Friedrich Kittler

== M–R ==
- Catherine Malabou
- Herbert Marcuse
- Karl Marx
- Marshall McLuhan
- Carl Mitcham
- Lewis Mumford
- José Ortega y Gasset
- Jussi Parikka
- Trevor Pinch
- Joseph C. Pitt
- Neil Postman
- Günter Ropohl

== S–Z ==
- Egbert Schuurman
- Emanuele Severino
- Gilbert Simondon
- Oswald Spengler
- Isabelle Stengers
- Bernard Stiegler
- Mariarosaria Taddeo
- Behnam Taebi
- Hemant Taneja
- Tiziana Terranova
- Eugene Thacker
- Iain Thomson
- Konstantin Tsiolkovsky
- Ibo van de Poel
- Jeroen van den Hoven
- Álvaro Vieira Pinto
- Meredith Whittaker
- Aimee van Wynsberghe
- Shannon Vallor
- Peter-Paul Verbeek
- Paul Virilio
- Langdon Winner
- McKenzie Wark
- John Zerzan
- Siegfried Zielinski
