= Technology for Improved Learning Outcomes =

The Technology for Improved Learning Outcomes (TILO) was an education development program that ran from ran from 2008 to 2013 in nine governorates across Egypt to improve the quality of teaching and learning through the use of technology in schools.

The U.S. Agency for International Development and the TILO team worked closely with the Ministry of Education, the Ministry of Communication and Information Technology and private sector partners to develop scalable models to integrate the use of education technology into schools.

== Schools ==
TILO works in two different types of schools:

- 85 experimental prep schools that are transformed into TILO Smart Schools (TSS schools) in seven governorates
- 192 primary and preparatory schools undergoing school based reform (SBR schools) in seven governorates

=== TILO TSS Schools ===
Governorate	Number of Schools
Alexandria	6
Cairo	37
Giza	12
Helwan	14
Beni Suef	8
Faiyum	4
Asyut	4

=== TILO SBR Idaras ===
- Alexandria Governorate
  - Montaza (30)
- Beni Suef Governorate
  - El Nasr (30)
  - El Wasta (24)
- Fayoum Governorate
  - Tameya (14)
- Minya Governorate
  - Beni Mazar (24)
  - Matay (20)
- Aswan Governorate
  - Nasr (28)
- Qena Governorate
  - Naga Hamedy (18)
- Helwan Governorate
  - (4)

== Philosophy ==
The TILO project was guided by an inter-ministerial Steering Committee and works in the following areas:

- Improving the quality of teaching and learning through technology
  - Builds capacity and demand at schools by working with schools that are committed to school reform and ready to take action
  - Provides a basic technology package to each participating school
  - Provides intensive training and support for teachers, senior teachers, supervisors and administrators in the use of technology as a tool for effective pedagogical practice
  - Provides training and support for subject matter experts and others making decisions at the Ministry level
  - Introduces a Digital Resource package that includes proven open-source software, tutorials, activities and applications that are linked directly to the Egyptian curriculum
- Developing public private partnerships
  - Builds partnerships to increase the basic technology infrastructure, training and digital resources at schools
  - Builds partnerships to foster best practice and innovation
  - Builds partnerships with local businesses and communities to sustain and extend the use of technology for learning
- Building capacity for effective management of education technology
  - Works with the Ministry of Education to develop systems of training and technology management that can be scaled and sustained
- Measuring impact
  - Monitors and evaluates project inputs and outcomes using seven TILO Monitoring and Evaluation Tools
  - Measures impact using SCOPE and CAPS
  - Captures baseline and post-training video clips in schools to build capacity and observe change
