= Timeline of rocket and missile technology =

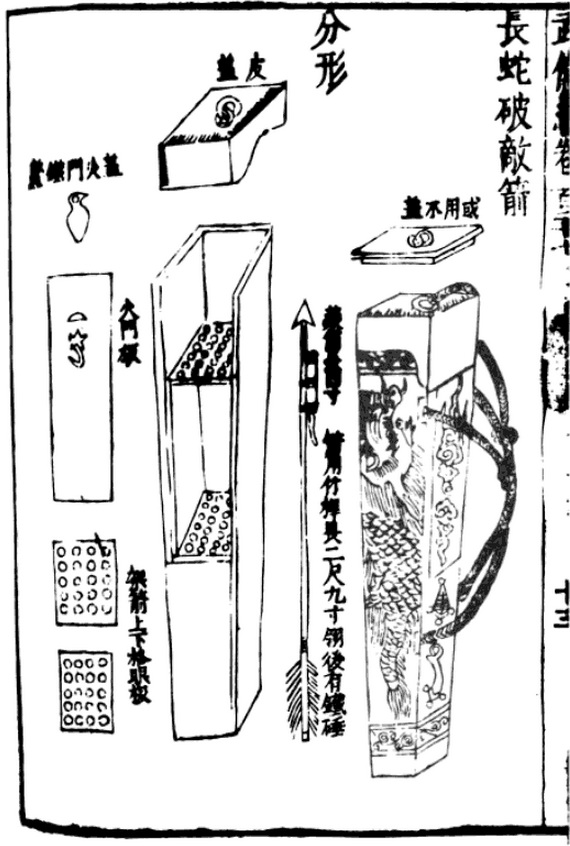
A depiction of the "long serpent" rocket launcher from the 11th century book Wujing Zongyao. The holes in the frame are designed to keep the fire arrows separate.

This article gives a concise timeline of rocket and missile technology.

== 11th century – 13th century ==
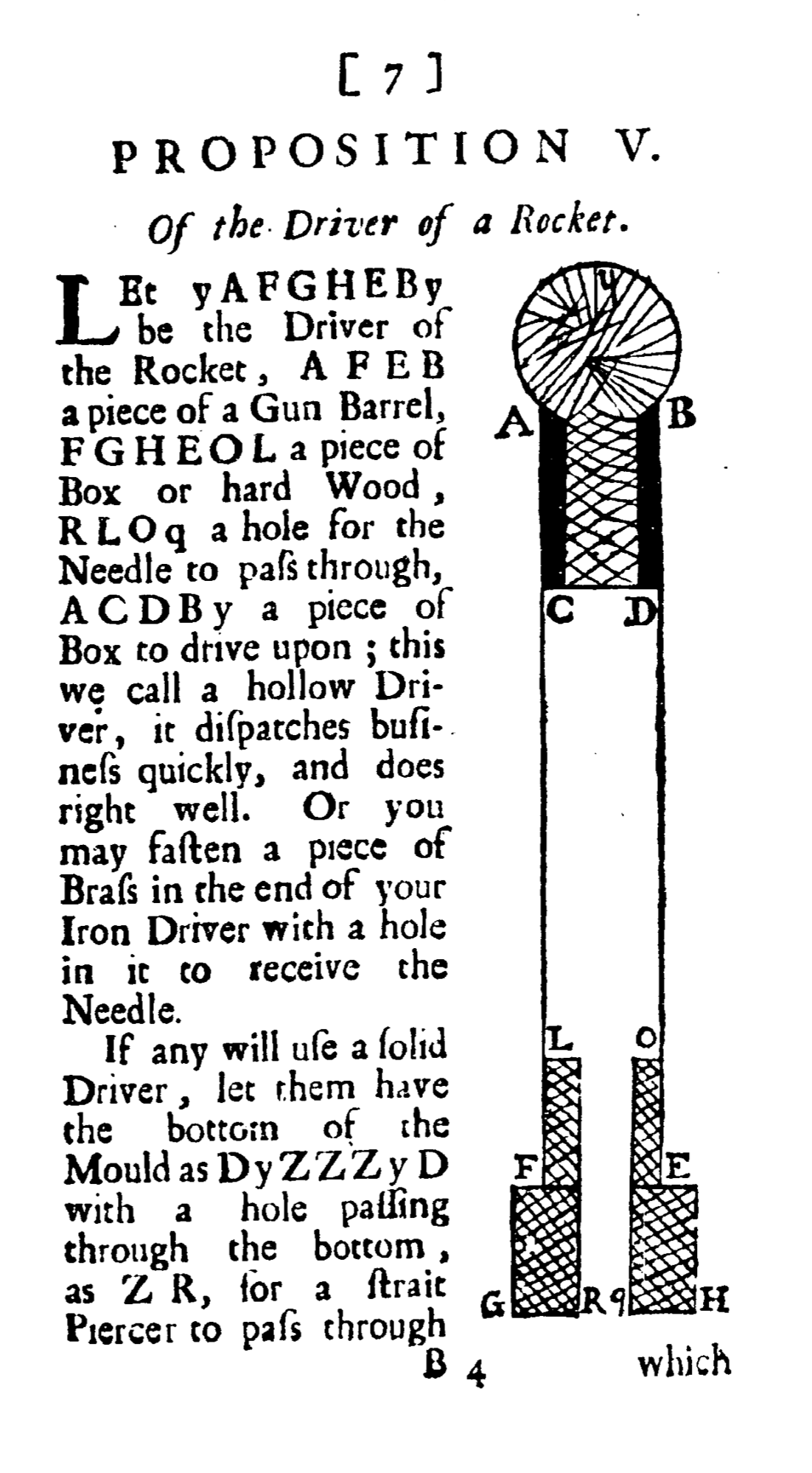
Robert Anderson suggests using metal for rocket casing

- 11th century AD - The first documented record of what appears to be gunpowder and the fire arrow, an early form of rocketry, appears in the Chinese text Wujing Zongyao.
- In Europe, around 1250 both Roger Bacon and the Liber Ignium gave instructions for constructing devices that appear to be rockets.

== 17th century – 19th century ==
- 1633 - Lagâri Hasan Çelebi launched a seven-winged rocket using 50 okka (140 lbs) of gunpowder from Sarayburnu, the point below Topkapı Palace in Istanbul.
- 1650 - Artis Magnae Artilleriae pars prima ("Great Art of Artillery, the First Part") is printed in Amsterdam, about a year before the death of its author, Kazimierz Siemienowicz.
- 1664 - A "space rocket" is imagined as a future technology to be studied in France and its drawing is ordered by French finance minister Jean-Baptiste Colbert; designed by Charles Le Brun on a Gobelins tapestry (see: French space program)
- 1696 - Robert Anderson suggests making rockets out of "a piece of a Gun Barrel" whose metal casing is much stronger than pasteboard or wood
- 1798 - Tipu Sultan, the King of the state of Mysore in India, develops and uses iron rockets against the British Army (see Mysorean rockets).
- 1801 - The British Army develops the Congreve rocket based on weapons used against them by Tipu Sultan.
- 1806 - Claude Ruggieri, an Italian living in France, launched animals on rockets and recovered them using parachutes. He was prevented from launching a child by police.
- 1813 - "A Treatise on the Motion of Rockets" by William Moore – first appearance of the rocket equation
- 1818 - Henry Trengrouse demonstrates his rocket apparatus for projecting a lifeline from a wrecked ship to the shore, later widely adopted
- 1844 - William Hale invents the spin-stabilized rocket
- 1861 - William Leitch publishes an essay "A Journey Through Space" (later published in his book God's Glory in the Heavens (1862)) in which he postulated the use of rockets for space travel because rockets would work more efficiently in a vacuum.

== 20th century ==
- 1902 - French cinema pioneer Georges Méliès directs A Trip to the Moon, the first film about space travel.
- 1903 - Konstantin Tsiolkovsky begins a series of papers discussing the use of rocketry to reach outer space, space suits, and colonization of the Solar System. Two key points discussed in his works are liquid fuels and staging.
- 1913 - Without knowing the work of Russian mathematician Konstantin Tsiolkovsky, French engineer Robert Esnault-Pelterie derived the equations for space flight, produced a paper that presented the rocket equation and calculated the energies required to reach the Moon and nearby planets.
- 1916 - first use of rockets (with the solid fuel Le Prieur rocket) for both air-to-air attacks, and air-to-ground.
- 1921 - Gas Dynamics Laboratory the first rocket research and development organization in the USSR established by N. I. Tikhomirov.
- 1922 - Hermann Oberth publishes his scientific work about rocketry and space exploration: Die Rakete zu den Planetenräumen ("By Rocket into Planetary Space").
- 1924 - Society for Studies of Interplanetary Travel founded in Moscow by Konstantin Tsiolkovsky, Friedrich Zander and 200 other space and rocket experts
- 1926 - Robert Goddard launches the first liquid fuel rocket. This is considered by some to be the start of the Space Age.
- 1927 - Verein für Raumschiffahrt (VfR - "Spaceflight Society") founded in Germany.
- 1928 - In Germany public displays of rocket experiments, initiated by Max Valier and Fritz von Opel, via Opel RAK which achieved speed records for ground and rail vehicles in 1928
- 1928 - first Soviet test-firing of a solid fuel rocket carried out by the Gas Dynamics Laboratory, which flew for about 1,300 meters
- 1929 - Woman in the Moon, considered to be one of the first "serious" science fiction films.
- 1931 - Friedrich Schmiedl attempts the first rocket mail service in Austria
- 1933 - Sergei Korolev and Mikhail Tikhonravov launch the first liquid-fueled rocket in the Soviet Union
- 1935 - Emilio Herrera Linares from Spain designed and made the first full-pressured astronaut suit, called the escafandra estratonáutica. The Russians then used a model of Herrera's suit when first flying into space which the Americans would then later adopt when creating their own space program
- 1936 - Research on rockets begins at the Guggenheim Aeronautical Laboratory at the California Institute of Technology (GALCIT), the predecessor to the Jet Propulsion Laboratory, under the direction of Frank Malina and Theodore von Kármán
- 1937 - Peenemünde Army Research Center founded in Germany
- 1938 - The Projectile Development Establishment founded at Fort Halstead for the United Kingdom's research into military solid-fuel rockets.
- 1939 - Katyusha multiple rocket launchers (Russian: Катюша) are a type of rocket artillery first built and fielded by the Soviet Union.
- 1941 - French rocket EA-41 is launched, being the first European liquid propellant working rocket (It was, however, preceded by the Peenemunde A5 and Soviet experiments.)
- 1941 - Jet Assisted Take Off JATO installed on US Army Air Corp Ercoupe aircraft occurred on 12 August in March Field, California.
- 1942 - Wernher von Braun and Walter Dornberger launch the first V-2 rocket at Peenemünde in northern Germany.
- 1942 - A V-2 rocket reaches an altitude of 85 km.
- 1944 - The V-2 rocket MW 18014 reaches an altitude of 176 km, becoming the first human-made object to reach space.
- 1945 - Lothar Sieber dies after the first vertical take-off crewed rocket flight in a Bachem Ba 349 "Natter"
- 1945 - Operation Paperclip takes 1,600 German rocket scientists and technicians to the United States
- 1945 - Operation Osoaviakhim takes 2,000 German rocket scientists and technicians to the Soviet Union
- 1946 - First flight of the Nike missile, later the first operational surface-to-air guided missile
- 1947 - The first animals sent into space were fruit flies aboard a V-2 rocket launched from New Mexico, USA
- 1947 - Chuck Yeager achieves the first crewed supersonic flight in a Bell X-1 rocket-powered aircraft
- 1949 - Willy Ley publishes The Conquest of Space
- 1952 - 22 May, French Véronique 1 rocket is launched from the Algerian desert.
- 1952 - Wernher von Braun discusses the technical details of a crewed exploration of Mars in Das Marsprojekt.
- 1953 - Colliers magazine publishes a series of articles on humanity's future in space, igniting the interest of people around the world. The series includes numerous articles by Ley and von Braun, illustrated by Chesley Bonestell.
- 1956 - First launch of PGM-17 Thor, the first US ballistic missile and forerunner of the Delta space launch rockets
- 1957 - Launch of the first ICBM, the USSR's R-7 (8K71), known to NATO as the SS-6 Sapwood.
- 1957 - The USSR launches Sputnik 1, the first artificial satellite.
- 1958 - The U.S. launches Explorer 1, the first American artificial satellite, on a Jupiter-C rocket.
- 1958 - US launches their first ICBM, the Atlas-B (the Atlas-A was a test article only).
- 1961 - US launched the Mercury-Redstone 2 mission, which made the chimpanzee Ham to become the first Hominidae in space.
- 1961 - the USSR launches Vostok 1, Yuri Gagarin reached a height of 327 km above Earth and was the first person to orbit Earth.
- 1961 - US, a Mercury capsule named Freedom 7 with Alan B. Shepard, spacecraft was launched by a Redstone rocket on a ballistic trajectory suborbital flight.
- 1962 - The US launches Mercury MA-6 (Friendship 7) on an Atlas D booster, John Glenn puts America in orbit.
- 1962 - Pakistan launched Rehbar-I and was the first country in Islamic world to successfully launch a vessel in outer space.
- 1963 - The USSR launches Vostok 6, Valentina Tereshkova was the first woman (and first civilian) in space and to orbit Earth. She remained in space for nearly three days and orbited the Earth 48 times.
- 1963 - US X-15 rocket-plane, the first reusable crewed spacecraft (suborbital) reaches space, pioneering reusability, carried launch and glide landings.
- 1965 - USSR Proton rocket, highly successful launch vehicle with notable payloads, Salyut 6 and Salyut 7, Mir, and ISS components
- 1965 - Robert Salked investigates various single stage to orbit spaceplane concepts
- 1965 - FR Diamant, first French and European rocket to reach orbit, France became the third space nation.

Buzz Aldrin on the surface of the Moon during Apollo 11

- 1966 - USSR Luna 9, the first soft landing on the Moon
- 1966 - USSR launches Soyuz spacecraft, the longest-running series of spacecraft, eventually serving Soviet, Russian and International space missions.
- 1968 - USSR Zond 5, two tortoises and smaller biological Earthlings circle the Moon and return safely to Earth.
- 1968 - US Apollo 8, the first crewed mission to reach and orbit the Moon.
- 1969 - US Apollo 11, first crewed landing on the Moon, first lunar surface extravehicular activity.
- 1975 - EU ESA, creation of the European Space Agency.
- 1979 - EU Ariane 1, first Ariane European rocket.
- 1980 - EU Arianespace, creation of Arianespace, world's first commercial space transportation company.
- 1981 - US Space Shuttle pioneers reusability and glide landings
- 1988 - EU Ariane 4, first launch of the Ariane 4 rocket.
- 1988 - USSR Energia delivers a Buran spaceplane to orbit.
- 1996 - EU Ariane 5, first flight of the Ariane 5 rocket, self-destructed in flight. After that, Ariane 5 will be the main European rocket for decades.
- 1998 - US Deep Space 1 is first deep space mission to use an ion thruster for propulsion.
- 1998 - Russia launches the Zarya module, the first part of the International Space Station.

== 21st century ==
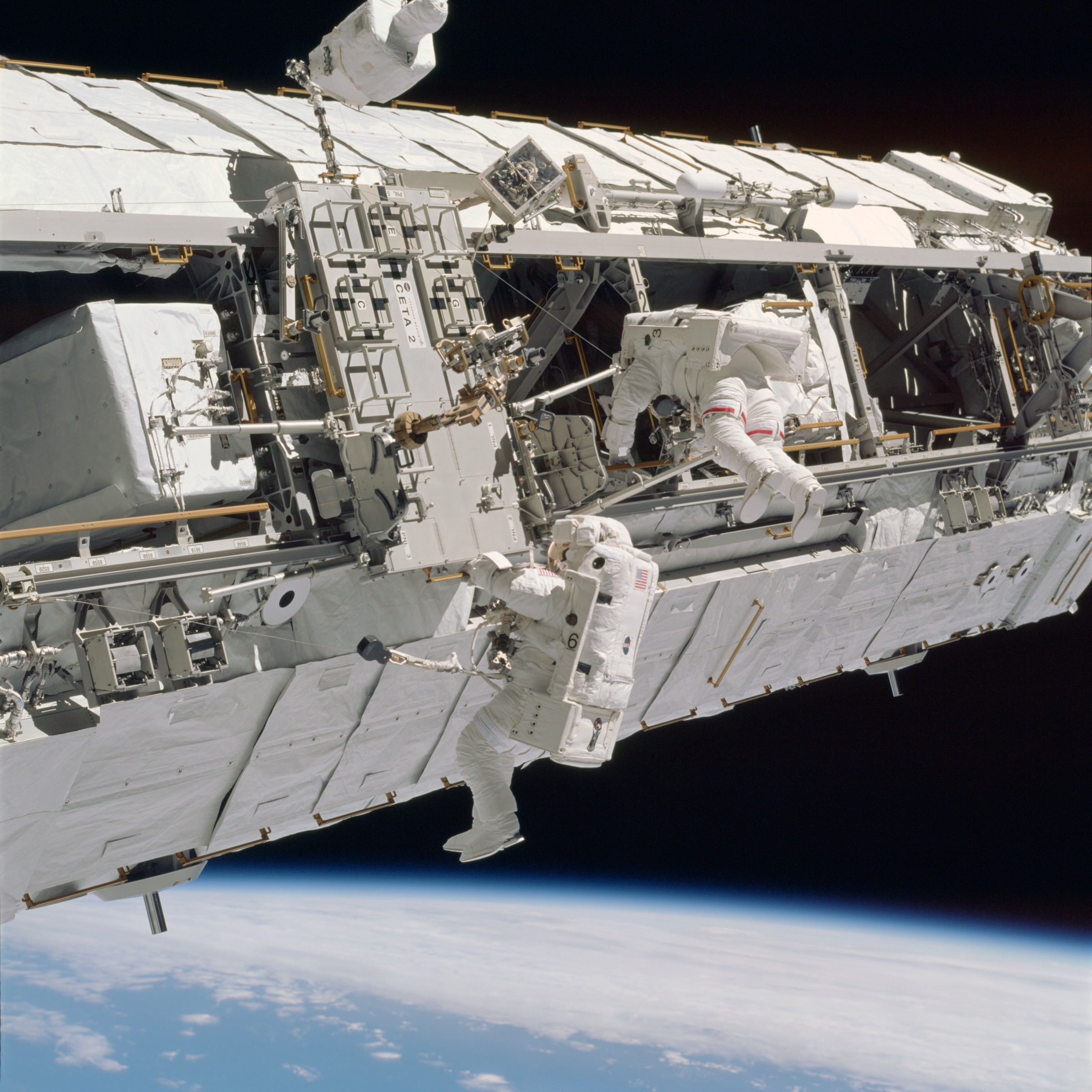
Astronauts assemble the ISS.

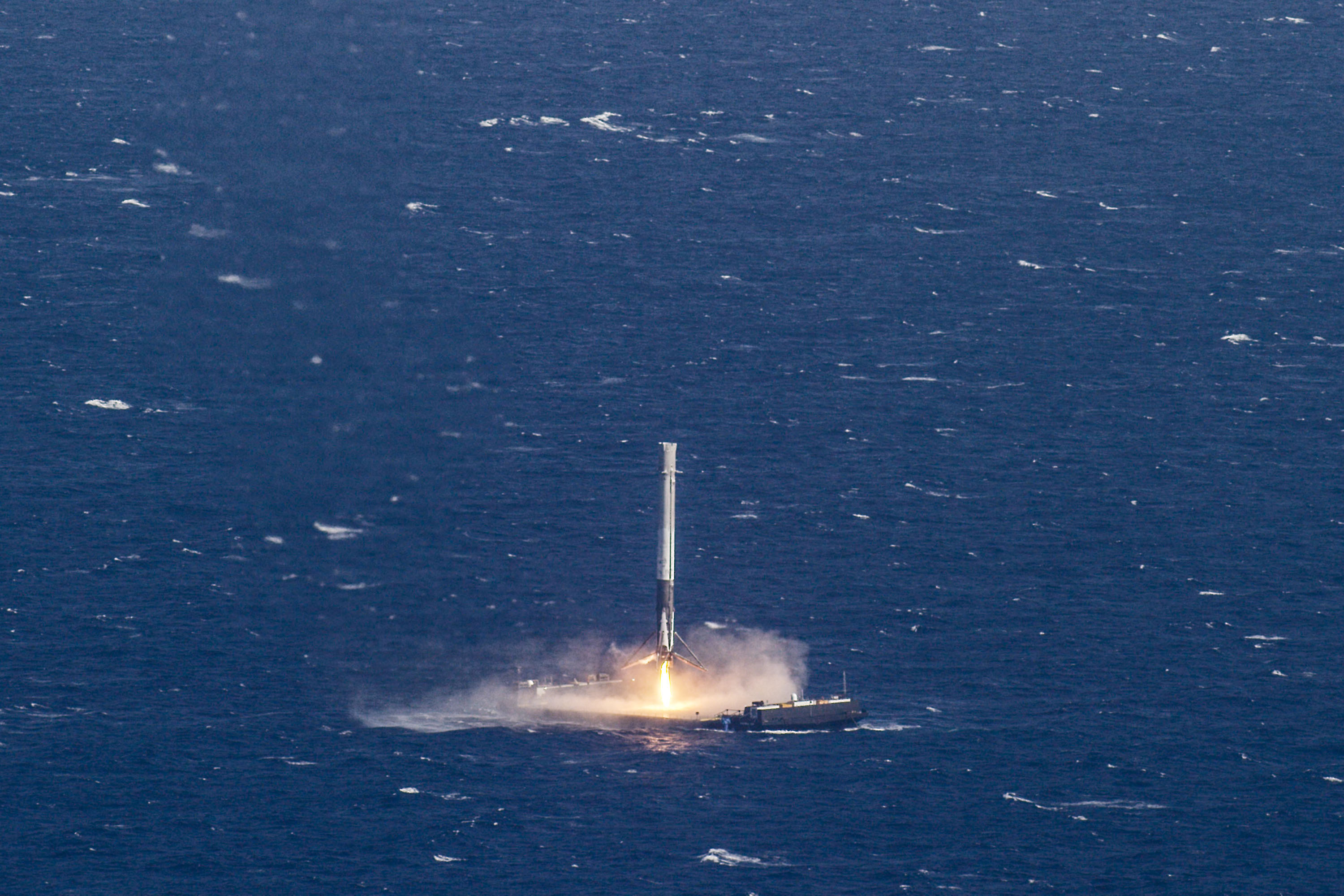
SpaceX first stage rocket returning from space to a drone ship at sea.

- 2001 - Russian Soyuz spacecraft sent the first space tourist Dennis Tito to International Space Station.
- 2004 - US-based, first privately developed, crewed (suborbital) spaceflight, SpaceShipOne demonstrates reusability.
- 2008 - SpaceX—with their Falcon 1 rocket—became the first private entity to successfully launch a rocket into orbit.
- 2012 - The SpaceX Dragon 1—launched aboard a Falcon 9 launch vehicle—was the first private spacecraft to successfully dock with another spacecraft, and was also the first private capsule to dock at the International Space Station.
- 2014 - First booster rocket returning from an orbital trajectory to achieve a zero-velocity-at-zero-altitude propulsive vertical landing. The first-stage booster of Falcon 9 Flight 9 made the first successful controlled ocean soft touchdown of a liquid-rocket-engine orbital booster on April 18, 2014.
- 2015 - SpaceX's Falcon 9 Flight 20 was the first time that the first stage of an orbital rocket made a successful return and vertical landing.
- 2017 - SpaceX's Falcon 9 SES-10 was the first time a used orbital rocket made a successful return
- 2018 - The Electron rocket was the first New Zealand rocket to achieve orbit. The rocket is also unique in using an electric-pump-fed engine. The rocket also carried an additional satellite payload called "Humanity Star", a 1-meter-wide (3.3-foot) carbon fiber sphere made up of 65 panels that reflect the Sun's light.
- 2023 - India launches Chandrayaan-3, the first spacecraft to land on the Moon's south pole.
- 2024 - SpaceX's Starship Flight Test 5 was the first time that the first stage of a rocket was successfully caught.
- 2026 Isar Aerospace launches Spectrum, from Andøya Spaceport becoming the first successful flight from a private Launch provider in Northern Europe.

== See also ==
- History of rockets
- List of missiles
- Lists of rockets
- Timeline of heat engine technology
