= Nickel titanium rotary file =

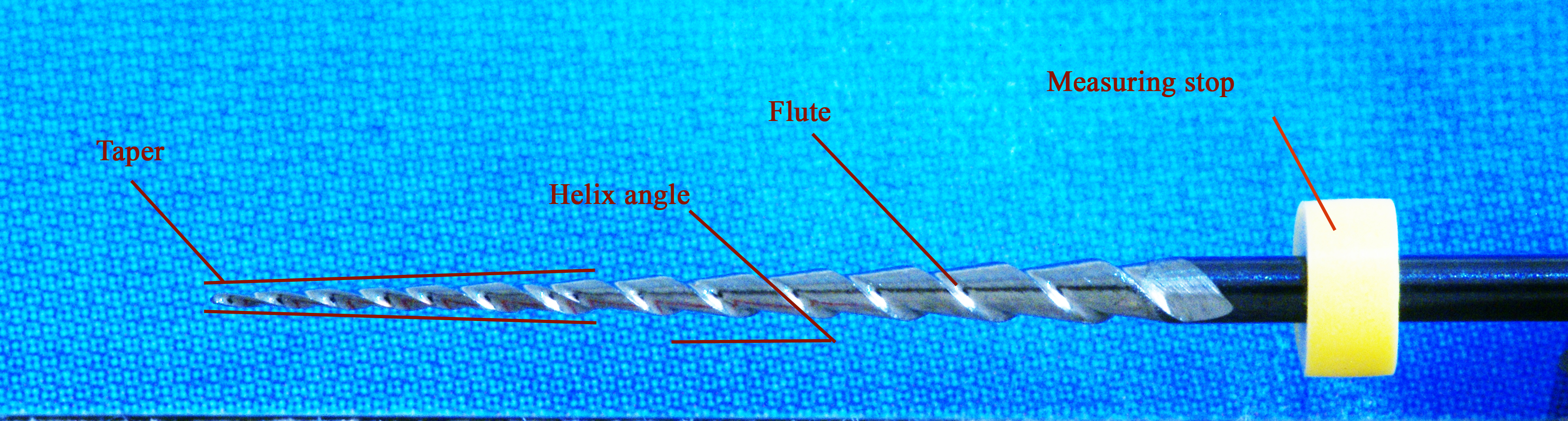
Nickel titanium rotary file used in dentistry

A nickel titanium rotary file is an engine-driven tapered and pointed endodontic instrument made of nickel titanium alloy with cutting edges used to mechanically shape and prepare the root canals during endodontic therapy or to remove the root canal obturating material while performing retreatment. The first nickel titanium rotary file was introduced to the market in 1991. Superelasticity and shape memory are the properties that make nickel titanium rotary files very flexible. The high flexibility makes them superior to stainless steel files for the purpose of rotary root canal preparation. The use of nickel titanium rotary files in dentistry is a common practice.

Nickel–titanium (NiTi) show the phenomenon of superelasticity where the stress remains constant, despite the increase in strain up till a certain range. Their superelastic property is caused by the austenite transforming into the martensite form. The strain remains constant during this transformation until the whole NiTi mass has converted to the martensite form, which would indicate that the superelasticity phase has ended.

== Components ==
The main components of a nickel titanium rotary file are tip size, taper, flutes, helix angle and measuring stop. There can be other features such as redial lands and measuring lines incorporated in some designs.

- Tip size – The tips size is the diameter of the tip of a file, which is in 100ths of a millimeter. Sometimes the instruments are named in a system according to what their tip sizes are numbered. The sizes range from 10–100.
- Taper – The taper of a file refers to the gradual increase in diameter along its working surface. Nickel titanium rotary files usually have a higher taper compared to the taper of standard traditional hand files which is 0.02 mm/mm (ISO taper of endodontic files, taper 0.02 mm/mm indicates 20 microns increase in diameter for every 1 mm gain in the length of a file). Their taper commonly ranges from 0.02 to 0.12 mm/mm. Different systems are sometimes classified according to their taper which can be constant or variable.
- Flutes – Flutes are the grooves on the working side of the files which can be produced either by twisting or grinding a wire. Flutes provide cutting edges and also space for debris collection. Therefore, their presence turns a wire into a shaping instrument which both cuts the tooth structure and acts as an auger. The depth, width, number, arrangement and the direction of the flutes play an important role on the behavior of a file.
- Helix angle – Helix angle is an angle between the cutting edge and the long access of a file. Helix angle plays an important role in debris collection and it also determines the direction of rotation. Helix angle can be constant or accelerating (changes along the length of a file). Accelerating helix angles decreases the screw in effect when most of the working surface of a file is engaged and it can decrease the torsion stress on a file.
- Measuring stop – Measuring stop is a piece of rubber that an operator can use to mark certain desired length on a file while using it. Measuring stops are referred to as stoppers and they can also be color coded corresponding to the size and number of a file.
- Radial land – The radial land is the peripheral portion of a rotary instrument that is flat and smooth designed to center the instrument in the central space.
- Pitch - The distance between a point on the leading edge and corresponding point on the adjacent edge. The shorter the pitch, the more spirals, the greater the helix angle. Having variable pitch decrease the screwing effect.

== Separation of nickel titanium rotary files ==
Separation of nickel titanium rotary files happens due to torsional failure, cyclic fatigue, or the combination of both in clinical practice.

- Torsional failure – Torsional failure happens when the tip of a file is locked but its shank is being rotated either manually or by a handpiece to the point that exceeds the elastic limit of the alloy.
- Cyclic fatigue – Cyclic fatigue occurs when a file rotates contentiously while it is under flexion in curved root canals. Constant compression and tension occurring on both sides of a file causes spread of defects and cracks which fatigues the file and causes separation.

It has been found that the decision to discard a rotary file after being used with regard to prevention of file separation is dependent on operator's skills and judgment.
