= Phonetic search technology =

Phonetic Search Technology (PST) is a method of speech recognition. An audio signal of speech is broken down into series of phonemes, which can be used to identify words. A string of six phonemes for example, “_B _IY _T _UW _B _IY,” represent the acronym “B2B”.
