= List of DNA nanotechnology research groups =

This list of DNA nanotechnology research groups gives a partial overview of academic research organisations in the field of DNA nanotechnology, sorted geographically. Any sufficiently notable research group (which in general can be considered as any group having published in well regarded, high impact factor journals) should be listed here, along with a brief description of their research.

== North America ==
Country	University / Institute	Group	Topic
United States	New York University	Seeman's Lab
United States	University of Central Florida	The Kolpashchikov Lab
United States	Arizona State University	Yan Lab
United States	Arizona State University	Hariadi Lab
United States	Harvard University	Shih's Lab
United States	Harvard University	Peng Yin's Lab
United States	Yale University	Chenxiang Lin's Lab
United States	Caltech	Winfree's Lab
United States	Caltech	Pierce's Lab
United States	Duke University	Rief's Lab
United States	UT Austin	Ellington's Lab
United States	Kent State University	Schmidt's Lab
United States	UC Berkeley	Ti Lab
United States	Brandeis University	Rogers Lab
Canada	University of Toronto	Chou Lab
Canada	McGill University	Sleiman's Lab
Canada	University of Montreal	Vallée-Bélisle's Lab

== Asia ==
Country	University / Institute	Group	Topic
Japan	Tokyo University	Rondelez's group

== Europe ==
Country	University / Institute	Group	Topic
Denmark	Aarhus University	Center for DNA nanotechnology
France	University of Bordeaux	CBMN
France	Université Pierre et Marie Curie	Estevez-Torres and Galas group
Germany	Technical University of Munich	Simmel's Lab
Germany	LMU Munich	Liedl's Lab
Germany	Technical University of Munich	Dietz's Lab
Germany	Max Planck Institute for Medical Research	Göpfrich's Lab
Germany	Max Planck Institute of Biochemistry	Heuer-Jungemann's Lab
Germany	JGU Mainz	Walther's Lab
England	University of Oxford	Turberfield's Lab
England	University College London	Howorka's Lab
Italy	University of Rome Tor Vergata	Ricci's Lab
Sweden	Karolinska Institute	Högberg's Lab
