= Medical technology assessment =

Medical technology assessment (MTA) is the objective evaluation of a medical technology regarding its safety and performance, its (future) impact on clinical and non-clinical patient outcomes as well as its interactive effects on economical, organizational, social, juridical and ethical aspects of healthcare. Medical technologies are assessed both in absolute terms and in comparison to other (combinations of) medical technologies, procedures, treatments or ‘doing-nothing’.

The aim of MTA is to provide objective, high-quality information that relevant stakeholders use for decision-making about for example development, pricing, market access and reimbursement of new medical technologies. As such, MTA is similar to health technology assessment (HTA), except that HTA has a wider scope and may include assessments of for example organizational or financial interventions.

The classical approach of MTA is to evaluate technologies after they enter the marketplace. Yet, a growing number of researchers and policy-makers argue that new technologies should be evaluated before they diffuse into routine clinical practice. MTA of biomedical innovations in a very early stage of development could improve health outcomes, minimise wrong investment and prevent social and ethical conflicts.

One particular method within the area of early MTA is constructive technology assessment (CTA). CTA is particularly appropriate for the early assessment of dynamic technologies that are implemented under uncertain circumstances. CTA is based on the idea that during the course of technology development, choices are constantly being made about the form, the function, and the use of that technology. Especially in early stages, technologies are not always stable, nor are its specifications and neither is its use, as both technology and environment will mutually influence each other. In recent years, CTA has developed from assessing the (clinical) impact of a new technology to a much broader approach, including the analysis of design, development, and implementation of that new technology.

In the Netherlands, the department Health Technology and Services Research (HTSR) of the University of Twente and the institute for Medical Technology Assessment (iMTA) of the Erasmus University Rotterdam perform early MTA and CTA in collaboration with technology users (patients, healthcare professionals), technology developers (academic and industrial), technology investors (venture capitalists, government, etc.) technology procurers (hospitals, patients, etc.) and decision-makers in healthcare (patients, policy-makers etc.) By performing excellent scientific research, that is valuable and relevant for society, HTSR and iMTA aim to support decisions about early development and implementation of health care technology in order to achieve high quality healthcare for individual patients. Examples of the research of HTSR include the early economic evaluation of neuromuscular electrical stimulation in the treatment of shoulder pain and early phase technology assessment of nanotechnology in oncology. Examples of the work if iMTA include the development of the widely used cost-effectiveness acceptability curves (CEACs), the introduction of the friction cost method, the valuation if informal care with the CarerQoL instrument and the estimation of indirect medical costs.
