= Close coupled field technology =

CCFT technology in an air sterilization duct unit.

Close coupled field technology (CCFT) is an air sterilization process that kills a high percentage of microbes, bacteria (including bacterial endospores), viruses, germs, mold spores, volatile organic compounds (VOCs), fungal air contaminants, and chemical agents and their associated odors.

CCFT uses small high-voltage coils within a Faraday cage to generate a non-thermal plasma field to destabilize inorganic and organic compounds at the molecular level. As air is passed through this electrostatic field it is converted to ozone which oxidizes airborne contaminants. Enclosing the ozone retains its ability to remove contaminants quickly while making it safe for populated environments.

== History ==
CCFT was invented by David Hallam to remove unpleasant odors from a nursing home where an ailing uncle was a resident. When the nursing staff noticed a dramatic decrease in the spread of infections, this led Hallam to further investigate CCFT. Hallam went on to develop the AirManager system, which uses a combination of CCFT and high airflow filtration (HAF), which filters any dust, pollen, airborne contaminants, and resultant debris from the CCFT process down to 0.1 micrometers.

CCFT technology is a variation of a class of technologies called non-thermal plasma, which is based on the discharge of high voltage static electricity. Using a variety of configurations, two electrodes are separated by various dielectric insulating materials. A voltage is increasingly applied to one electrode until it exceeds the dielectric capacity of the insulators, whereupon electric discharge occurs. When the electricity is discharged in the presence of air, high-energy electrons are formed which react with the chemicals and pathogens in air through a complex series of free radical reactions. As molecular oxygen is always present in the air, ozone is always formed as well. The use of small high voltage coils distinguishes this method from other approaches that use different configurations of dual electrodes, such as a wire insulated by glass beads passing through the center of a metal pipe, which serves as the second electrode.
