= Timeline of motor and engine technology =

Timeline of motor and engine technology

- (c. 30–70 AD) – Hero of Alexandria describes the first documented steam-powered device, the aeolipile.
- 13th century – Chinese chronicles wrote about a solid-rocket motor used in warfare.
- 1698 – Thomas Savery builds a steam-powered water pump for pumping water out of mines.
- 1712 – Thomas Newcomen builds a piston-and-cylinder steam-powered water pump for pumping water out of mines.
- 1769 – James Watt patents his first improved steam engine.

== 19th Century ==
- 1806 – François Isaac de Rivaz invented a hydrogen powered engine, the first successful internal combustion engine.
- 1807 – Nicéphore Niépce and his brother Claude build a fluid piston internal combustion engine, the Pyréolophore and use it to power a boat up the river Saône.
- 1816 – Robert Stirling invented his hot air Stirling engine, and what we now call a "regenerator".
- 1821 – Michael Faraday builds an electricity-powered motor.
- 1824 – Nicolas Léonard Sadi Carnot first publishes that the efficiency of a heat engine depends on the temperature difference between an engine and its environment.
- 1837 – First American patent for an electric motor (U.S. patent 132).
- 1850 – The first explicit statement of the first and second law of thermodynamics, given by Rudolf Clausius.
- 1860 – Lenoir 2 cycle engine
- 1872 – Brayton Engine
- 1877 – Nicolaus Otto patents a four-stroke internal combustion engine (U.S. patent 194,047).
- 1882 – James Atkinson invents the Atkinson cycle engine, now common in some hybrid vehicles.
- 1885 – Gottlieb Daimler patents the first supercharger.
- 1886 – Hot-bulb engine was established by Herbert Akroyd Stuart, Gottlieb Daimler invents the Petrol engine.
- 1888 – An AC induction motor is featured in a paper published by Galileo Ferraris and is patented in the U.S. by Nikola Tesla.
- 1892 – Rudolf Diesel patents the Diesel engine (U.S. patent 608,845).
- 1899 – Ferdinand Porsche creates the Lohner–Porsche, the first hybrid vehicle.

== 20th Century ==
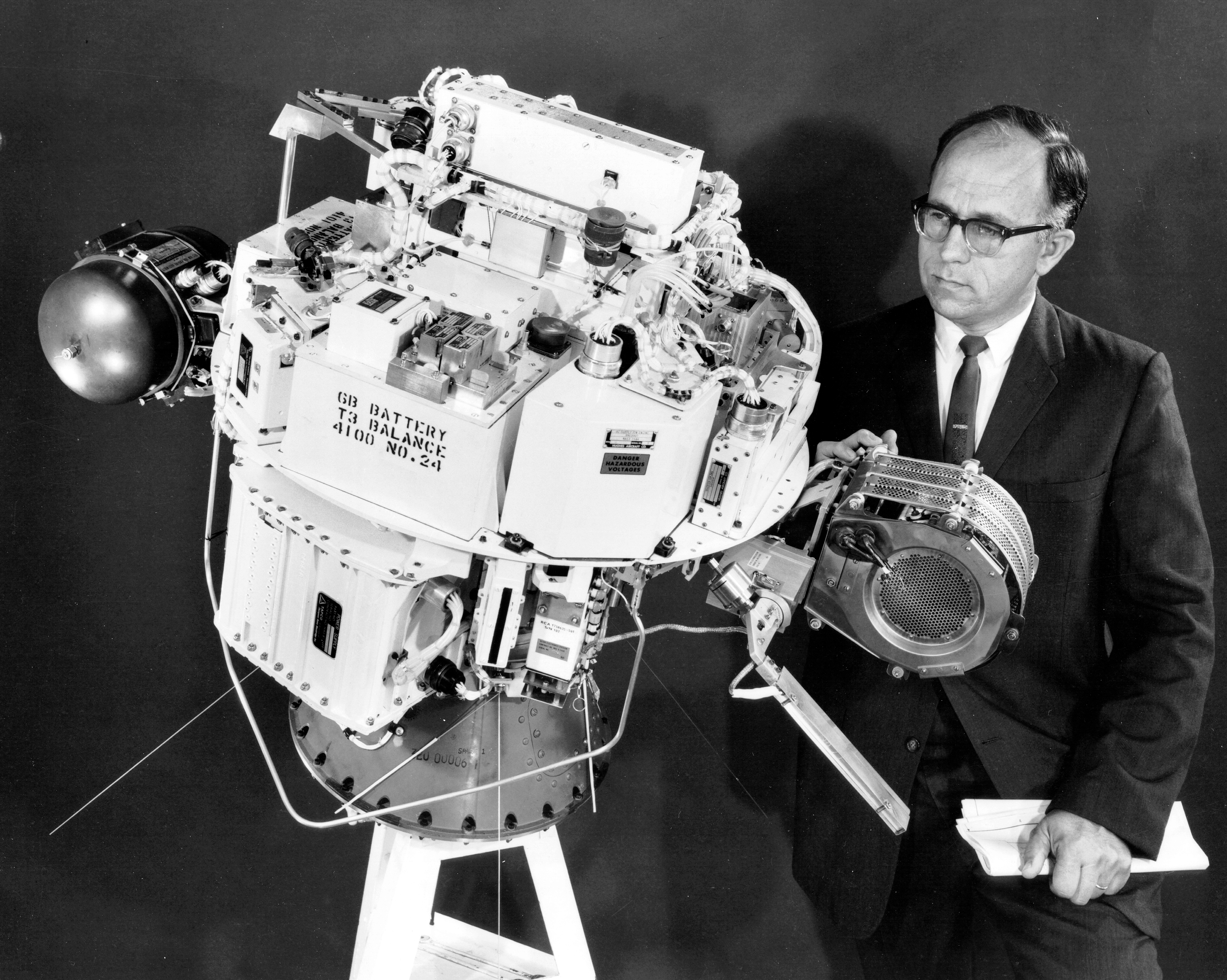
First ion engine, NASA, 1964

- 1903 – The Exploration of Cosmic Space by Means of Reaction Devices was published by Konstantin Tsiolkovsky
- 1905 – Alfred Büchi patents the turbocharger.
- 1913 – René Lorin invents the ramjet.
- 1915 – Leonard Dyer invents a six-stroke engine, now known as the Crower six-stroke engine named after his reinventor Bruce Crower.
- 1926 – Robert H. Goddard launched the first liquid-fueled rocket.
- 1929 – Felix Wankel patents the Wankel rotary engine (U.S. patent 2,988,008).
- Late 1930s – Hans von Ohain and Frank Whittle separately build pioneering gas turbine engines intended for aircraft propulsion, leading to the pioneering turbojet powered flights in 1939 Germany and 1941 England.
- 1939 – The BMW company's BMW 801 aviation radial engine pioneers the use of an early form of an engine control unit, the Kommandogerät.
- 1940s – Ralph Miller patents his Miller cycle engine.
- 1954 – Felix Wankel creates the first working Wankel engine.
- 1957 – Rambler Rebel announced Electrojector electronic fuel injection option, however no production models were offered with the option.
- 1964 – Ion engine invented.
- 1966 – RD-0410 nuclear thermal rocket engine was ground-tested.
- 1960s – alternators replace generators on automobile engines.
- 1970s – electronically controlled ignition appears in automobile engines.
- 1975 – Catalytic converters are first widely introduced on production automobiles in the US to comply with tightening EPA regulations on auto exhaust.
- 1980s – electronically controlled ignition improved to reduce pollution.
- 1980s – electronic fuel injection appears on gasoline automobile engines.
- 1989 – The Bajulaz Six-Stroke Engine was invented by the Bajulaz S A company, based in Geneva, Switzerland; it has U.S. patent 4,809,511 and U.S. patent 4,513,568.
- 1990s – Hybrid vehicles that run on an internal combustion engine (ICE) and an electric motor charged by regenerative braking.

== See also ==
- Timeline of heat engine technology for a view of the human understanding of the interchangeability of work and heat.
