= Technolangue/Easy =

French syntactic parsing project

Technolangue/Easy was the first evaluation campaign for the syntactic parsers of French.

This project was supported by the French Research Ministry (Ministère de recherche français).

Technolangue/Easy included four tasks between 2003 and 2006:

- corpora constitution
- production of consensual annotation guidelines
- manual corpora annotation using a dedicated annotation formalism
- evaluation of the participating parsers

13 laboratories and companies submitted their parser to the evaluation (making a total of 16 runs) with 7 research laboratories, 3 R&D institutes and 3 private companies. Said in other terms, most of the existing French parsers competed.
