= Technographic segmentation =

Technographic segmentation for marketing management is a market research analysis tool used to identify and profile the characteristics and behaviors of consumers through the process of market segmentation. Traditionally market researchers focused on various demographic, psychographic, and lifestyle schemes to categorize and describe homogeneous clusters of consumers that comprise possible target markets.

With the advent of personal computers and home video in the late 1980s and the explosion in Internet use, personal digital assistants, BlackBerries, video games, cell phones, etc. in the 1990s, information and communication technologies have emerged as a central focus and defining force in a wide range of occupations and lifestyles. Accordingly, market researchers realized the need for a segmentation scheme based on the role that technology plays in consumers' lives.

== Development ==
Technographic segmentation was developed to measure and categorize consumers based on their ownership, use patterns, and attitudes toward information, communication and entertainment technologies.

The concept and technique was first introduced in 1985 by Dr. Edward Forrest in a study of VCR users. It was elaborated upon in the article "Segmenting VCR Owners" published in the Journal of Advertising Research. The article suggested that the profiling of technology consumers "should be based on an amalgam of variables which might best be referred to as 'technographic'... which focuses on the motivations, usage patterns, attitudes about technology... as well as measures of a person's fundamental values and lifestyle perspective."

The concept has been adopted by Forrester Research, Inc. as a research service for information-technology and marketing professionals, business strategists, and technology industry executives. Technographics has two categories, Social Technographics and Mobile Technographics. Technographic data can be mined from technical support forums, company social media postings, press releases, government/public websites, and even online job postings.

== See also ==
- Advertising research
- Consumer behavior
- Experimental techniques
- Integrated Marketing Communications
- List of marketing research firms
- Marketing
- Marketing research process
- Quantitative marketing research
- Qualitative marketing research
