= Technoflash =

1972 Canadian TV series

- Genre: Documentary
- Directed by: Terese Patry; Jac Segard
- Theme music composer: André Gagnon
- Country of origin: Canada
- Original language: English
- No. of seasons: 2

Production
- Producer: Terese Patry
- Production location: Montreal

Original release
- Network: CBC Television
- Release: 9 January 1972 – 7 January 1973

Technoflash is a Canadian documentary television series that aired on CBC Television from 1972 to 1973.

This series featured the role of technology in Canadian industry.

== Scheduling ==
The half-hour episodes were broadcast Sundays at 2:30 p.m. (Eastern) on 9, 23 and 30 January 1972, 27 February 1972, 5 and 19 March 1972 and 7 January 1973.
