= Suspension array technology =

Suspension array technology (or SAT) is a high throughput, large-scale, and multiplexed screening platform used in molecular biology. SAT has been widely applied to genomic and proteomic research, such as single nucleotide polymorphism (SNP) genotyping, genetic disease screening, gene expression profiling, screening drug discovery and clinical diagnosis. SAT uses microsphere beads (5.6 um in diameter) to prepare arrays. SAT allows for the simultaneous testing of multiple gene variants through the use of these microsphere beads as each type of microsphere bead has a unique identification based on variations in optical properties, most common is fluorescent colour. As each colour and intensity of colour has a unique wavelength, beads can easily be differentiated based on their wavelength intensity. Microspheres are readily suspendable in solution and exhibit favorable kinetics during an assay. Similar to flat microarrays (e.g. DNA microarray), an appropriate receptor molecule, such as DNA oligonucleotide probes, antibodies, or other proteins, attach themselves to the differently labeled microspheres. This produces thousands of microsphere array elements. Probe-target hybridization is usually detected by optically labeled targets, which determines the relative abundance of each target in the sample.

== Overview of SAT using DNA hybridization ==
Overview of the suspension array technology procedures, using DNA hybridization as a model.

DNA is extracted from cells used to create test fragments. These test fragments are added to a solution containing a variety of microsphere beads. Each type of microsphere bead contains a known DNA probe with a unique fluorescent identity. Test fragments and probes on the microsphere beads are allowed to hybridize to each other. Once hybridized, the microsphere beads are sorted, usually using flow cytometry. This allows for the detection of each of the gene variants from the original sample. The resulting data collected will indicate the relative abundance of each hybridized sample to the microsphere.

== Multiplexing ==
Since microsphere beads are easily suspended in solution and each microsphere retains its identity when hybridized to the test sample, a typical suspension array experiment can analyze a wide range of biological analysis in a single reaction, called "multiplexing". In general, each type of microsphere used in an array is individually prepared in bulk. For example, the commercially available microsphere arrays from Luminex xMAP technology uses a 10X10 element array. This array involves beads with red and infrared dyes, each with ten different intensities, to give a 100-element array. Thus, the array size would increase exponentially if multiple dyes are used. For example, five different dyes with 10 different intensities per dye will give rise to 100,000 different array elements.

== Procedure ==
=== Sample targeting ===
When using different types of microspheres, SAT is capable of simultaneously testing multiple variables, such as DNA and proteins, in a given sample. This allows SAT to analyze variety of molecular targets during a single reaction. The common nucleic acid detection method includes direct DNA hybridization. The direct DNA hybridization approach is the simplest suspension array assay whereby 15 to 20 bp DNA oligonucleotides attached to microspheres are amplified using PCR. This is the optimized probe length as it minimizes the melting temperature variation among different probes during probe-target hybridization. After amplifying one DNA oligoprobe of interest, it can be used to create 100 different probes on 100 different sets of microspheres, each with the capability of capturing 100 potential targets (if using a 100-plex array). Similarly, target DNA samples are usually PCR amplified and labeled. Hybridization between the capture probe and the target DNA is achieved by melting and annealing complementary target DNA sequences to their capture probes located on the microspheres. After washing to remove non-specific binding between sequences, only strongly paired probe-targets will remain hybridized.

=== Sorting and detection with flow cytometry ===
For more details on this topic, see flow cytometry

Since the optical identity of each microsphere is known, the quantification of target samples hybridized to the microspheres can be achieved by comparing the relative intensity of target markers in one set of microspheres to target markers in another set of microspheres using flow cytometry. Microspheres can be sorted based using both their unique optical properties and level of hybridization to the target sequence.

== Strengths ==
- Rapid/high throughput: In multiplex analysis, a 100-plex assay can be analyzed in every 30 seconds. The recent reported high-throughput flow cytometry can sample a 96-well plate in 1 minute, and theoretically, the 100-plex assay with this system can be analyzed in less than 1 second, or potentially deliver 12 million samples per day.
- High array density/multiplex: Compared to flat microarrays, SAT allows one to perform parallel measurements. A few microliters of microspheres could contain thousands of array elements and each array element is represented by hundreds of individual microspheres. Thus, the measurement by flow cytometry represents a replicate analysis of each array element.
- Effective gathering of information: One of the benefits of using SAT is that it allows you to take one sample from a patient or research organism and simultaneously test for multiple gene variants. Thus, from a single sample you can determine which virus from a series of viruses a patient has, or which base pair mutation is present in the organism with a unique phenotype.
- Cost-effective: Currently, commercially available suspension array kits costs $0.10-$0.25 per sequence tested.

== Weaknesses ==
- Relatively low array size: Although it has the potential to use an increased amount of dyes to generate millions of different array elements, the current generation of commercially available microsphere arrays (from Luminex xMAP technology) only uses two sets of dyes and therefore can only detect ~100 targets per experiment.
- Hybridization between different sets of probes and target sequences requires a specific annealing temperature, which is affected by length and sequence of the oligonucleotide probe. Therefore, for every experiment, only one possible annealing temperature can be used. Thus, all probes used in given experiment must be designed to hybridize to the target at the same temperature. Although introducing base pair mismatch in some sets of the probes could minimize annealing temperature differences between each set of probes, the hybridization problem is still significant if more than 10-20 targets are tested in one reaction.
