= Consumer adoption of technological innovations =

Consumer adoption of technological innovations is the process consumers use to determine whether or not to adopt an innovation. This process is influenced by consumer characteristics, such as personality traits and demographic or socioeconomic factors, the characteristics of the new product, such as its relative advantage and complexity, and social influences, such as opinion leaders.

In the context of technological innovations, the adoption process is also influenced by one or several new technologies that are incorporated in the new product. New technologies are likely to significantly affect the innovation's functionality or interface. Functionality refers to the set of potential benefits that a product can provide the consumer. Interface refers here to the specific means by which a consumer interacts with a product to obtain a particular functionality. Specifically, new technologies suggest four types of innovations with unique characteristics that are likely to affect the adoption process. Alternatively it can be looked at as a Paradox of Technology.

== Paradox of Technology ==
Donald Norman in his book, The Design of Everyday Things, outlines the idea of "Paradox of Technology". Norman's paradox states that when a new functionality is added to a technology, it also increases its complexity. Thus, a technology intended to make life easier by providing more functionality, also makes it more complex by making things harder to learn. A good design must reduce the difficulties in use of the ever-growing technology.

Information and communications technologies such as Facebook experienced this phenomenon when they released the News Feed functionality to all users. The new groundbreaking feature was met with mass upheaval with only one in 100 messages about News Feed being positive. Now, News Feed is an essential feature of Facebook which users today would be outraged if removed.

== Symbolic Interactionism ==
Symbolic interactionism, the concept that people act toward things based on the meaning they have for them; and these meanings are derived from social interaction and modified though interpretation), plays a key in role in the consumer adoption of technological innovations. People have personal meanings for certain aspects of the technology; when these technologies are changed or modified it can greatly affect how the user interacts with the technology.

A good example of this concept is the controversial removal of the Start Menu from Microsoft's Windows 8. A major reason this was so controversial is this concept of symbolic internationalism. Critique Mark Wilson writes, "I grew up on Windows 3.1 and the introduction of the Start button/menu in Windows 95 was a revelation. Windows 8 was a step in the wrong direction." Similar critiques and reactions was a major issue and Microsoft even brought it back the next release of Windows. Many including Microsoft will argue the start menu was dated and that the newer metro start screen is an improvement upon the start menu but that is still up to debate and preference.

== Social influences ==
When a new technology is introduced a user evaluates if the perceived benefits (functionality, aesthetics etc.) outweigh any negative social nuances it may introduce. New technology not only changes the way that the user interacts with it, but often also asks users to embrace new behaviors. However, as our technologies are increasingly becoming more mobile, these new behaviors frequently take place in a public location and become an integral part of a user's social appearance.

It is often the case that every new technology introduces public discomfort. While the first handheld cellular phone was developed in 1973, it was not until the early 2000s that they technology became truly ubiquitous. While a part of the slow growth of cellular phones can be attributed to its design, another big part was the technology being considered esoteric by many.

Sandra Vannoy and Prashant Palvia developed a theoretical model called the "Social Influence Model" that investigates technology adoption at a societal or communal level. They postulate that social influence consists of four overlapping phenomenon:

1. Social Computing Action: actions performed through use of technology such as Web browsers and cell phones.
2. Social Computing Consensus: agreement from all people that it is right to carry out the action.
3. Social Computing Cooperation: participating in a way that is in the best interests of the group.
4. Social Computing Authority: recognizing that the authority imposed by the group supersedes traditional authority.

Technology adoption is typically measured on two factors: embedment and embracement in daily life. Social influence deals with the embedment of technology. Embedment in daily life is evaluated by examining how other members of the society present in the same environment utilize the technology, and how the technology is perceived by these members.

== Existing functionality and existing interface ==
These innovations are incremental in nature since they offer an existing functionality and an existing interface; however, they are usually characterized by esthetic changes that affect the product's appearance. Smart phones, for example, are usually black or silver when first introduced into the market but are available in multiple colors several months later.

== Existing functionality and new interface ==
These innovations provide benefits available by existing products but result in a new set of actions for the consumer. Voice recognition software is one example of this type of innovation. Consumers create documents or emails, for example, by dictating (instead of typing) to a computer.

== New functionality and existing interface ==
These innovations do not change consumer interaction with a device; they offer, however, a new functionality. Multi-mode cellphones, for example, operate in more than one frequency and enable roaming between different countries.

== New functionality and new interface ==
Car GPS navigation systems, for example, fall under this category. These products provide the consumer with novel functionality, such as door-to-door navigation and real-time traffic information. The novel interface implies a new set of actions for using the device, such as using a touch-screen and voice recognition interfaces. Innovations that incorporate a novel interface require significant learning cost from the consumer since they imply learning a new set of tasks. High learning cost is likely to hinder the adoption of such innovations, unless the functionality provided is new and provides significant benefits to the consumer. Furthermore, innovations incorporating a novel interface often result in fear of technological complexity leading to feelings of ineptitude and frustration. Conversely, innovations that provide the consumer with a new functionality are characterized by a high relative advantage, which is likely to facilitate adoption.

== Impact of privacy concerns ==
As technologies have improved in the past years privacy has become a major concern among consumers because the data revolution and Big Data. Technological innovations more recently have seriously been affected by these concerns and changes how people interact with these new technologies. Privacy is a very broad concept, it is very hard to define in simple manners and is still a controversial subject, and because of this confusion, consumers reject many innovations or unknowingly give their personal data to third parties. Daniel J. Solove is an expert in the topic of Privacy and in his recent book Understanding Privacy he lays out the problems and frameworks of privacy in the era of technology and the data revolution. Another good example is Eli Pariser's concept of The Filter Bubble that he lays out in his book, The Filter Bubble: What the Internet Is Hiding from You. Innovations like personalized search from Google are very controversial mainly because most consumers have no idea that it is even occurring.
