= Ceramic mixing technology =

Ceramic mixing technology is used to mix and blend ceramics to create end products such as: ceramic powder blends, injection molding feedstock, electronics, decorative finishes, refractory linings, batteries and fuel cells, thermally conductive pastes, investment casting slurries, dental ceramics and advanced composites.

A wide range of equipment is available for these requirements.
