= Timeline of heat engine technology =

This timeline of heat engine technology describes how heat engines have been known since antiquity but have been made into increasingly useful devices since the 17th century as a better understanding of the processes involved was gained. A heat engine is any system that converts heat to mechanical energy, which can then be used to do mechanical work.They continue to be developed today.

In engineering and thermodynamics, a heat engine performs the conversion of heat energy to mechanical work by exploiting the temperature gradient between a hot "source" and a cold "sink". Heat is transferred to the sink from the source, and in this process some of the heat is converted into work.

A heat pump is a heat engine run in reverse. Work is used to create a heat differential. The timeline includes devices classed as both engines and pumps, as well as identifying significant leaps in human understanding.

== Pre-17th century ==
- Prehistory – The fire piston used by tribes in southeast Asia and the Pacific islands to kindle fire.
- c. 450 BC – Archytas of Tarentum used a jet of steam to propel a toy wooden bird suspended on wire.
- c. 50 AD – Hero of Alexandria's Engine, also known as Aeolipile. Demonstrates rotary motion produced by the reaction from jets of steam.
- c. 10th century – China develops the earliest fire lances which were spear-like weapons combining a bamboo tube containing gunpowder and shrapnel like projectiles tied to a spear.
- c 12th century – China, the earliest depiction of a gun showing a metal body and a tight-fitting projectile which maximises the conversion of the hot gases to forward motion.
- 1125 – Gerbert, a professor in the schools at Rheims designed and built an organ blown by air escaping from a vessel in which it was compressed by heated water.
- 1232 – First recorded use of a rocket. In a battle between the Chinese and the Mongols. ( see Timeline of rocket and missile technology for a view of rocket development through time.)
- c. 1500 – Leonardo da Vinci builds the Architonnerre, a steam-powered cannon.
- 1543 – Blasco de Garay, a Spanish naval officer demonstrates a boat propelled without oars or sail that utilised the reaction from a jet issued from a large boiling kettle of water.
- 1551 – Taqi al-Din demonstrates a steam turbine, used to rotate a spit.

== 17th century ==
- 1629 – Giovanni Branca demonstrates a steam turbine.
- 1662 – Robert Boyle publishes Boyle's Law which defines the relationship between volume and pressure in a gas at a constant temperature.
- 1665 – Edward Somerset, the Second Marquess of Worcester builds a working steam fountain.
- 1680 – Christiaan Huygens publishes a design for a piston engine powered by gunpowder but it is never built.
- 1690 – Denis Papin – produces design for the first piston steam engine.
- 1698 – Thomas Savery builds a pistonless steam-powered water pump for pumping water out of mines.

== 18th century ==
- 1707 – Denis Papin – produces design for his second piston steam engine in conjunction with Gottfried Leibniz.
- 1712 – Thomas Newcomen builds the first commercially successful piston-and-cylinder steam-powered water pump for pumping water out of mines. It is known as an atmospheric engine and operates by condensing steam in a cylinder to produce a vacuum which moves the piston by atmospheric pressure.
- 1748 – William Cullen demonstrates the first artificial refrigeration in a public lecture at the University of Glasgow in Scotland.
- 1759 – John Harrison uses a bimetallic strip in his third marine chronometer (H3) to compensate for temperature-induced changes in the balance spring. This converts thermal expansion and contraction in two dissimilar solids to mechanical work.
- 1769 – James Watt patents his first improved atmospheric steam engine, see Watt steam engine with a separate condenser outside the cylinder, doubling the efficiency of earlier engines.
- 1787 – Jacques Charles formulates Charles's law which describes the relationship between a gas's volume and temperature. He does not publish this however and it is not recognised until Joseph Louis Gay-Lussac develops and references it in 1802.
- 1791 – John Barber patents the idea of a gas turbine.
- 1799 – Richard Trevithick builds the first high pressure steam engine. This used the force from pressurized steam to move the piston.

== 19th century ==
- 1802 – Joseph Louis Gay-Lussac develops Gay-Lussac's law which describes the relationship between a gas's pressure and temperature.
- 1807 – Nicéphore Niépce installed his 'moss, coal-dust and resin' fuelled Pyréolophore internal combustion engine in a boat and powered up the river Saone in France.
- 1807 – Franco/Swiss engineer François Isaac de Rivaz built the De Rivaz engine, powered by the internal combustion of hydrogen and oxygen mixture and used it to power a wheeled vehicle.
- 1816 – Robert Stirling invented Stirling engine, a type of hot air engine.
- 1824 – Nicolas Léonard Sadi Carnot developed the Carnot cycle and the associated hypothetical Carnot heat engine that is the basic theoretical model for all heat engines. This gives the first early insight into the second law of thermodynamics.
- 1834 – Jacob Perkins, obtained the first patent for a vapor-compression refrigeration system.
- 1850s – Rudolf Clausius sets out the concept of the thermodynamic system and positioned entropy as being that in any irreversible process a small amount of heat energy δQ is incrementally dissipated across the system boundary
- 1859 – Etienne Lenoir developed the first commercially successful internal combustion engine, a single-cylinder, two-stroke engine with electric ignition of illumination gas (not gasoline).
- 1861 – Alphonse Beau de Rochas of France originates the concept of the four-stroke internal-combustion engine by emphasizing the previously unappreciated importance of compressing the fuel–air mixture before ignition.
- 1861 – Nicolaus Otto patents a two-stroke internal combustion engine building on Lenoir's.
- 1867 – James Clerk Maxwell postulated the thought experiment that later became known as Maxwell's demon. This appeared to violate the second law of thermodynamics and was the beginning of the idea that information was part of the physics of heat.
- 1872 – Pulsometer steam pump, a pistonless pump, patented by Charles Henry Hall. It was inspired by the Savery steam pump.
- 1873 – The British chemist Sir William Crookes invents the light mill a device which turns the radiant heat of light directly into rotary motion.
- 1877 – Theorist Ludwig Boltzmann visualized a probabilistic way to measure the entropy of an ensemble of ideal gas particles, in which he defined entropy to be proportional to the logarithm of the number of microstates such a gas could occupy.
- 1877 – Nicolaus Otto patents a practical four-stroke internal combustion engine (U.S. patent 194,047)
- 1883 – Samuel Griffin of Bath UK patents a six-stroke internal combustion engine.
- 1884 – Charles A. Parsons builds the first modern Steam turbine.
- 1886 – Herbert Akroyd Stuart builds the prototype Hot bulb engine, an oil fueled Homogeneous Charge Compression Ignition engine similar to the later diesel but with a lower compression ratio and running on a fuel air mixture.
- 1887 – Lord Rayleigh discussed the theoretical possibility of a thermoacoustic heat engine that could turn a temperature difference directly into mechanical movement using only sound waves. The Rijke tube had already demonstrated this in 1859.
- 1892 – Rudolf Diesel patents the Diesel engine (U.S. patent 608,845) where a high compression ratio generates hot gas which then ignites an injected fuel. After five years of experimenting and assistance from MAN company, he builds a working diesel engine in 1897.

== 20th century ==
- Approx 1910 an unknown inventor produces the toy ''Drinking bird'', a toy bird that oscillates continuously on a pivot powered by the evaporation and condensation of a volatile liquid. A wet end and a dry end of the toy produce a slight temperature difference through the evaporation of water.
- 1909, the Dutch physicist Heike Kamerlingh Onnes develops the concept of enthalpy for the measure of the "useful" work that can be obtained from a closed thermodynamic system at a constant pressure.
- 1913 – Nikola Tesla patents the Tesla turbine based on the Boundary layer effect.
- 1926 – Robert Goddard of the US launches the first liquid-fuel rocket.
- 1929 – Felix Wankel patents the Wankel rotary engine (U.S. patent 2,988,008)
- 1929 – Leó Szilárd, in a refinement of the famous Maxwell's demon scenario conceives of a heat engine that can run on information alone, known as the Szilard engine.
- 1930 – Sir Frank Whittle in England patents the first design for a gas turbine for jet propulsion.
- 1933 – French physicist Georges J. Ranque invents the Vortex tube, a fluid flow device without moving parts, that can separate a compressed gas into hot and cold streams.
- 1935 – Ralph H. Fowler invents the title 'the zeroth law of thermodynamics' to summarise postulates made by earlier physicists that thermal equilibrium between systems is a transitive relation.
- 1937 – Hans von Ohain builds a gas turbine
- 1940 – Hungarian Bela Karlovitz working for the Westinghouse company in the US files the first patent for a magnetohydrodynamic generator, which can generate electricity directly from a hot moving gas
- 1942 – R.S. Gaugler of General Motors patents the idea of the Heat pipe, a heat transfer mechanism that combines the principles of both thermal conductivity and phase transition to efficiently manage the transfer of heat between two solid interfaces.
- 1950s – The Philips company develop the Stirling-cycle Stirling Cryocooler which converts mechanical energy to a temperature difference.
- 1957 – the first demonstration of a practical arc-mode caesium vapor thermionic converter by V. Wilson. Electrons from a hot cathode act as a working fluid which condenses on a cold anode and produces an electric current. Several applications of it were demonstrated in the following decade, including its use with solar, combustion, radioisotope, and nuclear reactor heat sources.
- 1959 – Geusic, Schultz-DuBois and Scoville of Bell Telephone Laboratories USA build a Three Level Maser which runs as a quantum heat engine extracting work from the temperature difference of two heat pools.
- 1962 – William J. Buehler and Frederick Wang discover the Nickel titanium alloy known as Nitinol which has a shape memory dependent on its temperature.
- 1962 – Nikolaus Rott reopened the topic.of thermoacoustic engines described by Lord Rayleigh in 1887 and produced a full theoretical analysis which led to technological development and a working device carried on the Space Shuttle in 1992.
- 1992 – The first practical magnetohydrodynamic generators are built in Serbia and the USA.

== 21st century ==
- 2011 – Shoichi Toyabe and others demonstrate a working Szilard engine using a phase-contrast microscope equipped with a high speed camera connected to a computer.
- 2011 – Michigan State University builds the first wave disk engine. An internal combustion engine which does away with pistons, crankshafts and valves, and replaces them with a disc-shaped shock wave generator.
- 2019 – A working quantum heat engine based on a spin-1/2 system and nuclear magnetic resonance techniques is demonstrated by Roberto Serra and others at the Universities of Waterloo, and the Universidade Federal do ABC and Centro Brasileiro de Pesquisas Físicas.
- 2020 – A nano scale device that can act either as a heat engine or as a refrigerator by utilising quantum effects, is demonstrated by engineers at RIKEN Advanced Device Laboratory.

== See also ==
Related timelines:

- Timeline of rocket and missile technology – Rockets can be considered to be heat engines. The heat of their exhaust gases is converted into mechanical energy.
- History of thermodynamics
- History of the internal combustion engine
- Timeline of motor and engine technology
- Timeline of steam power
- Timeline of temperature and pressure measurement technology

For a timeline of all human technology see:

- Timeline of historic inventions
