= Self-drying concrete technology =

Self-drying concrete technology is found in certain cementitious patching and leveling materials and tile setting mortars used in the flooring industry. Self-drying technology allows the cement mix to consume all of its mix water while curing, eliminating the need for excess water to evaporate prior to installing flooring. Traditional floor coverings, such as VCT, sheet vinyl, carpet and ceramic tile, can be installed before the material is completely dry and as soon as it hardens, which typically happens in the first two hours after placement.

== Description ==
Traditional concrete has a water:cement ratio of about 0.5, which refers to the weight of the water divided by the weight of the cement. A water:cement ratio of 0.5 provides good workability while keeping the amount of excess water in the mix fairly low. Without at least this much extra water, the concrete would be too dry to place.

The chemical reaction of Portland cement and water that is known as hydration, which is necessary for the strengthening of the concrete, requires a water:cement ratio of only about 0.25. With a water:cement ratio of 0.5, there is twice the amount of water in the concrete mix than what is needed for hydration. This excess water needs to evaporate before flooring can be installed. Note: The magical number of 28 days defines only the designed strength of the concrete but has nothing to do with the dryness of it. E.g. A 10-year-old concrete slab can contain more moisture than a 28-day-old slab! Conversely, a self-drying concrete blend consumes all of its mix water with a water:cement ratio of up to 0.6, maintaining good workability while allowing flooring to be installed before it is completely dry.

There are also cement products that are partially self-drying, meaning that they use a high percentage of their mix water for hydration as opposed to using 100% of it. This type of product might be used when the flooring does not need to be installed the same day but must still be installed more quickly than traditional concrete would allow. For instance, products that are 80% self-drying allow flooring to be installed the next day, typically after a 16-hour cure.

Self-drying technology was developed by Ardex in Germany and was introduced in the United States in 1978.

== See also ==
- Self-consolidating concrete
