= Eudoxa =

Swedish think tank

Eudoxa was a Swedish think tank based in Stockholm that was active during the 2000s and early 2010s. Its work focused on science and technology policy, with an emphasis on the societal implications of emerging technologies.

The organization engaged in policy analysis, report publication, and the organization of seminars and conferences. Its activities addressed issues related to biotechnology, health care, intellectual property, digital technologies, and other areas connected to technological innovation.

Eudoxa participated in public debate through publications and events and collaborated with external organizations in Sweden and internationally. As part of its work, it published the book *More Choices, Better Health* in 2008 by Bartley J. Madden, which discusses market-oriented approaches to pharmaceutical development and regulation.

In the 2014 *Global Go To Think Tank Index Report*, published by the Think Tanks and Civil Societies Program at the University of Pennsylvania, Eudoxa was listed among the world’s science and technology think tanks.

The organization ceased operations in 2016.
