= Peter-Paul Verbeek =

Dutch philosopher (born 1970)

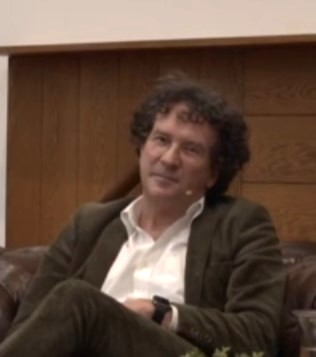
Verbeek in 2023

Peter-Paul Verbeek (Dutch: [vərˈbeːk]; born 6 December 1970 in Middelburg) is a Dutch philosopher who is Rector Magnificus of the University of Amsterdam and Professor of Philosophy and Ethics of Science and Technology in a Changing World since 1 October 2022.

Prior to his appointment in Amsterdam, Verbeek, a Dutch philosopher of technology, was chair of the philosophy department at the University of Twente. He was a member of the Dutch council for the Humanities and chair of the Society for Philosophy and Technology. Since 2018, he has also been University Professor of Philosophy of Humans and Technology and scientific codirector of the DesignLab at the University of Twente. He is an honorary professor at Aalborg University in Denmark. Furthermore, Verbeek was, among other things, vice-chair of the Board of the Rathenau Institute and chair of the Committee for the Freedom of Scientific Pursuit at the Royal Netherlands Academy of Arts and Sciences.

== Background ==
Verbeek studied Philosophy of Science, Technology & Society at the University of Twente and obtained his PhD in 2000. His dissertation was published in English under the title "What things do: philosophical reflections on technology, agency and design". He worked closely together with Hans Achterhuis and Don Ihde in formulating an original, post-phenomenological approach in the tradition of Philosophy of Technology. As chair of the philosophy department at the University of Twente, he has been chairman of the Young Academy, the platform for young researchers of the Royal Netherlands Academy of Arts and Sciences. He worked on a research project for which he obtained an NWO Vici grant aimed at the expansion of his theory of technological mediation in the areas of metaphysics, epistemology and ethics.

In 2018 Verbeek was elected a member of the Royal Netherlands Academy of Arts and Sciences.

== Theory of technological mediation ==
Verbeek's theory of technological mediation builds on the postphenomenological approach that was first stipulated by Don Ihde. This approach finds its origins in a synthesis between classical phenomenology and American pragmatism, with as one of its major premises the thesis that "technology only bears meaning in a use context". From a critique of classical philosophy of technology, in which Verbeek explicitly elaborates on the existentialist philosophy of Karl Jaspers and the hermeneutic philosophy of technology of Martin Heidegger.

Verbeek presents the aim of his theory of technological mediation as a systematic analysis of the influence of technology on human behavior, focusing on the role technology plays in human–world relations. In his original theory, a number of different human-technology-world relations are stipulated (the first four based on the philosophy of Don Ihde):

- Embodiment relations: in which the technology does not call attention to itself but to aspects of the world given through it (e.g. glasses)
- Hermeneutic relations: in which the technology represents a certain aspect of the world (e.g. a thermometer)
- Background relations: in which technology shapes the experiential context, going beyond conscious experience (e.g. room temperature through a central heating system)
- Alterity relations: in which technology presents itself as quasi other to the subject (e.g. an ATM)
- Cyborg relations: in which technology merges with the human (e.g., brain implants)
- Immersion relations: in which technology forms an interactive context (e.g., smart homes)
- Augmentation relations: in which technology mediates and alters our experience of the world, e.g., Google Glass.

A unique feature of Verbeek's philosophy of technology is its basis in an empirical analysis of technologies. Instead of generating an overarching framework by which the universal features of specific technologies can be analyzed, Verbeek takes the technology itself as point of departure; which is for example illustrated by his analysis of ultrasound technology

== Administrative tenure ==
During his tenure as Rector of the University of Amsterdam, Verbeek oversaw the response to student protests against his refusal to cut institutional partnerships with organizations aiding the Gaza genocide. Protests were part of a global call to exert pressure on universities which "enable" genocide. Verbeek was criticized by academic staff and students at the university for refusing to cut ties as the university had done in the case of the Russian invasion of Ukraine, for allowing physical injury to students by repeatedly calling police to disperse protestors, and for limiting political speech on campus in violation of Article 9 of the Dutch Constitution. In particular, Verbeek repeatedly ignored advice by representative bodies such as the Works Council and the Student Council and refused dialogue with unionized academic staff, resulting in "discontent about the lack of a constructive dialogue between governance and community, which creates distrust and stops communication." This culminated in a labor strike of academic staff, the Netherlands' first strike over Palestine.

On 15 October 2025, the board of the University of Amsterdam announced that it would finally cut partnerships with Israeli universities, citing its "responsibility to continue reflecting on external academic collaborations and the values ...adhere[d] to in these collaborations" two years after the start of the Gaza genocide and over a year and a half after the International Court of Justice ruled the plausibility of an ongoing genocide in Gaza.

On 30 January 2026 Verbeek announced his departure as rector, to become president of the Royal Netherlands Academy of Arts and Sciences.

== Selected works ==
- Verbeek, P.P. (2011), Moralizing Technology: Understanding and Designing the Morality of Things. Chicago and London: University of Chicago Press.
- Verbeek, P.P. (2005), What Things Do – Philosophical Reflections on Technology, Agency, and Design. Penn State: Penn State University Press, ISBN 0-271-02539-5 (264 pp.)
- Kroes, P. and P.P. Verbeek (eds.) (2014), The Moral Status of Technical Artefacts. Dordrecht: Springer, ISBN 978-94-007-7913-6 (248 pp.)
- Verbeek, P.P. and A. Slob (eds.) (2006), User Behavior and Technology Development – Shaping Sustainable Relations between Consumers and Technologies. Dordrecht: Springer, ISBN 1-4020-4433-X (412 pp.)
