= Marva Dawn =

American theologian (1948–2021)

- Born: August 20, 1948; Napoleon, Ohio
- Died: April 18, 2021 (aged 72)
- Education: Concordia University Chicago; University of Idaho; Pacific Lutheran Theological Seminary; University of Notre Dame
- Occupations: Christian theologian Author; Musician; Preacher; Educator

Marva J. Dawn (August 20, 1948 – April 18, 2021) was an American Christian theologian, author, musician, preacher, and educator. She was associated with the parachurch organization Christians Equipped for Ministry in Vancouver, Washington where she taught Christians around the globe. She also served as a Teaching Fellow in Spiritual Theology at Regent College in Vancouver, British Columbia. Dawn was generally perceived as a Lutheran evangelical. She often wrote in a paleo-orthodox style, stressing the importance of Christian tradition and the wisdom of the Church through the centuries.

== Biography ==
Born in Napoleon, Ohio as Marva Gersmehl, she later took the surname Dawn as a pseudonym. She was raised a Lutheran.

After completing a B.A. (1970) from Concordia Teachers College, she completed a M.A. (1972) in English from the University of Idaho, an M.Div. (1978) in New Testament from Western Evangelical Seminary, and a Th.M. (1983) in Old Testament from Pacific Lutheran Theological Seminary. She then completed an M.A. (1986) and Ph.D. (1992) in Christian Ethics and the Scriptures from the University of Notre Dame. She has taught for clergy and worship conferences and at seminaries in North America and internationally.

She was married to Myron Sandberg, an elementary school teacher, in 1989.

She struggled with illnesses such as cancer, chronic pain, blindness in one eye, a kidney transplant, and foot problems.

She died in Vancouver, Washington on April 18, 2021.

== Theology and beliefs ==
Dawn wrote numerous books on worship, spirituality, and Christian ethics. Her work emphasized the importance of liturgy, Sabbath-keeping, and spiritual formation in the Christian life.

Her 1995 book, Reaching Out Without Dumbing Down: A Theology of Worship for the Turn-of-the-Century Culture, which urged a second look at so-called "contemporary Christian worship", caused a stir in evangelical circles, being the first scholarly work from within the evangelical community to seriously question "seeker sensitive" style worship. Dawn claimed that much contemporary worship, which seeks primarily to evangelize through entertainment, is not really Christian worship at all. Rather than focus on bringing people into the church through worship, Dawn argued that worship should instead focus upon the glory and grace of the triune God, not ignoring the artistic treasures and traditions of the Church through the ages. The book remains her most widely read and most talked about work. Dawn continued this exploration in her 1999 book, A Royal "Waste" of Time: The Splendor of Worshiping God and Being Church for the World.

Another one of Dawn's works, "Is It a Lost Cause? Having the Heart of God for the Church's Children" published in 1997 is about the challenges of passing on the Christian faith to the next generation and how the church can better engage children and young people in its life and mission. In "Is It a Lost Cause?", Marva Dawn argues that the church needs to do a better job of recognizing and valuing children as full members of the community of faith. She asserts that children are not the "church of the future" but rather the "church of today" and that they have important contributions to make to the life of the church.

In her more recent work, Dawn has drawn on Albert Borgmann's notion of the device paradigm to develop a critique of the church in its capitulation to commodification where worship, for example, becomes a device to attract and please.

=== List of works ===
- Talking the Walk: Letting Christian Language Live Again (2018). Eugene, OR: Wipf & Stock. ISBN 9781532640063
- Being Well When We're Ill: wholeness and hope in spite of infirmary (2008) Augsburg Books ISBN 978-0-8066-8038-5
- The Sense of the Call: A Sabbath way of life for those who serve God, the church, and the world (2006). Grand Rapids, MI: Eerdmans. ISBN 9780802844590
- How Shall We Worship?: Biblical Guidelines for the Worship Wars (2015). Eugene, OR: Wipf & Stock. ISBN 9781725235212
- In the Beginning, GOD: Creation, Culture, and the Spiritual Life (2009). Downers Grove, IL: InterVarsity Press. ISBN 9780830837076
- Keeping the Sabbath Wholly: Ceasing, Resting, Embracing, Feasting
- My Soul Waits: Solace for the Lonely in the Psalms (2007). Downers Grove, IL: InterVarsity Press. ISBN 9780830834433
- The Sense of the Call: A Sabbath Way of Life for Those Who Serve God, the Church, and the World. (2006) Grand Rapids, MI; Cambridge, U.K.: William B. Eerdmans Publishing Company. ISBN 978-0-8028-4459-0
- Unfettered Hope: A Call to Faithful Living in an Affluent Society (2003). Louisville: Westminster John Knox Press. ISBN 9781611644449
- Powers, Weakness, and the Tabernacling of God (2001). Grand Rapids, MI: Eerdmans. ISBN 9780802847706 (2002 Christianity Today Book Award in the category of The Church/Pastoral Leadership)
- Morning by Morning: Daily Meditations from the Writings of Marva J. Dawn (2001). Grand Rapids, MI: Eerdmans. ISBN 9780802847690
- Truly the Community: Romans 12 and How to Be the Church (1997; formerly titled The Hilarity of Community). Grand Rapids, MI: Eerdmans. ISBN 9780802844668
- The Unnecessary Pastor: Rediscovering the Call (2000). With Eugene H. Peterson. Grand Rapids, MI: Eerdmans. ISBN 9780802846785
- A Royal Waste of Time: The Splendor of Worshiping God and Being Church for the World (1999). Grand Rapids, MI: Eerdmans. ISBN 9780802845863
- I'm Lonely, LORD - How Long?: Meditations on the Psalms (1998). Grand Rapids, MI: Eerdmans. ISBN 9780802844712
- Is It a Lost Cause?: Having the Heart of God for the Church's Children (1997). Grand Rapids, MI: Eerdmans. ISBN 9780802843739
- Reaching Out Without Dumbing Down: A Theology of Worship for This Urgent Time (1995). Grand Rapids, MI: Eerdmans. ISBN 9780802841025
- Joy in our Weakness A Gift of Hope from the Book of Revelation (1994). St. Louis, MO: Concordia Publishing House. ISBN 9780570046387
- Sexual Character: Beyond Technique to Intimacy (1993). Grand Rapids, MI: Eerdmans. ISBN 9780802807007
- To Walk and Not Faint (1980). New York: Christian Herald Books. ISBN 9780915684656
