= Device paradigm =

In the philosophy of technology, the device paradigm is the way "technological devices" are perceived and consumed in modern society, according to Albert Borgmann. It explains the intimate relationship between people, things and technological devices, defining most economic relations and also shapes social and moral relations in general.

The concept of the device paradigm is a critical response to Heidegger's notion of Gestell. It has been widely endorsed by philosophers of technology, including Hubert Dreyfus, Andrew Feenberg, and Eric Higgs, as well as environmental philosopher David Strong.

== Devices ==
For Borgmann, a device is a thing that is used as a means to an end. Therefore, a device is seen as "the compound of commodity and machinery" while "the distinctive pattern of division and connection of its components is the device paradigm." This term is meant to signify or distinguish between technological devices and "focal things and practices," which matter to people in their everyday affairs.

A focal thing is something of ultimate concern and significance, which may be masked by the device paradigm, and must be preserved by its intimate connection with practice. Borgmann used the case of wine to explain this. He cited that the focal thing in winemaking involves the implements used to produce wine. Wine becomes a device when it employs technology and machinery not merely to produce wine but obtain specific qualities such as grapey, smooth, light, and fruity flavors or clean and clear appearance.

As technological devices increase the availability of a commodity or service, they also push these devices into the background where people do not pay attention to their destructive tendencies. For example, the technology of central heating means that warmth is readily available and family members can retreat into the solitude of their rooms instead of working to chop wood or stoke the fires. Social interaction is reduced and the family struggles to find activities that enable such nurturing and care for each other. The ubiquitous nature of information technology also makes it an important example of device paradigm.

== See also ==
- The Question Concerning Technology
