= Technology and the Character of Contemporary Life =

1984 book by Albert Borgmann

Technology and the Character of Contemporary Life: A Philosophical Inquiry
- Author: Albert Borgmann
- Publisher: University of Chicago Press
- Publication date: 1984
- ISBN: 0-226-06629-0

Technology and the Character of Contemporary Life: A Philosophical Inquiry (1984) is a work in the philosophy of technology. It introduces the device paradigm, a pattern for how technology shapes our lives, and the concept of focal things and practices, as an alternative to the device paradigm. This work defines the device paradigm as a pattern in which technological devices produce commodities. Both words are used in new senses, defined within the work: A commodity is something we receive from a device with very little effort on our part, like recorded music or heat from a central heating system. Commodities come from devices, machines that produce them but simultaneously obscure where these things come from.

The device paradigm is contrasted with focal things and practices, also defined in the book. Unlike commodities, focal things require effort and skill to produce, like music played on a musical instrument or the warmth of a hearth. Because focal practices take skill, those who participate in them experience the focal things produced by them more richly than the commodities offered by the device paradigm.

While there is a place in modern society for the device paradigm, the book argues, it has become so pervasive that it displaces focal things and practices from most of our lives. Since focal things and practices guide us into the good life, we should work both as individuals and a society to recognize the value of them and preserve a place for them, using technology to support rather than supplant them.

The book was written by Albert Borgmann. Borgmann was a German-born American philosopher specializing in the philosophy of technology, and was a professor of philosophy at the University of Montana. Borgmann's device paradigm extends mid-century modern philosophical inquiries into the nature of technology including Heidegger's notion of Gestell (enframing) and Jacques Ellul's Technique (technology as a dominating force in the world). The book explores the limitations of conventional ways of thinking about technology and its social context, both liberal democratic ideals, and Marxist lines of thought, concluding with a call for the reform of technology and the device paradigm via focal things and practices.

Like much work in the philosophy of technology, the work tends to remain on the sidelines of thought. Philosophers of technology generally acknowledge the pattern, but some argue that the pattern is not as pervasive as Borgmann claims. For example, rather than displacing human social connection, women use telephones to maintain and build narrative and tradition and capitalism is another force beyond the device paradigm that shapes our lives.

== Outline ==
Borgmann's text has a three part approach: Part 1 deals with terminological and philosophical starting points, Part 2 with Borgmann's original theory of technology (the device paradigm), and Part 3 with focal things and practices.

=== Part 1 ===
Chapter 1, “Technology and Theory,” takes a cursory glance at Borgmann's main thesis: there is a pattern that can be detected in how we currently relate to technology. This pattern constitutes a paradigm that understands technology mainly in terms of devices, thus the “device paradigm.” Our seeing technology as device—simply means, with a shrinking perception of ends—endangers “focal things and practices” which are meant to “center and illuminate our lives” (4). With this thesis previewed, he briefly explains in what sense his book can be called a philosophy, and moves on.

Chapter 2, “Theories of Technology,” presents several current understandings of technology, which must be explored, as Borgmann will be presenting a competing one. First, he explains and rejects “the substantive view,” which may be understood as technological determinism. He also rejects “the instrumentalist view,” which sees technology simply as a “value-neutral tool” (10), and “the pluralist view” because it is basically the view that there can be no definitive “view” of technology to begin with. The chapter ends with another hint that his new “paradigmatic explanation of technology” (12) might suffice to supplant earlier rival ones. Chapter 3, “The Choice of a Theory,” expands this last point by shortly examining the work of Carl Mitcham.

Chapters 4-6 go together and make several key points: any theory—like Borgmann's to-be-proposed “device paradigm,” needs to deal with science both in relation to technology and as an epistemological basis for truth claims. However, though science “explains everything more precisely and more generally than any prior mode of explanation,” it also has explanatory limits and negative effects when too heavily relied upon, and may be enhanced, again, by the device paradigm (22).

Chapter 7, “Science and Technology,” finishes out Part 1. First, Borgmann explains that science tells us about the world as it actually is, while technology allows us to transform it into other possible worlds (27). The problem, however—returning to the limits of science from Chapter 6—is that “Neither . . . has a theory of what is worthy and in need of explanation or transformation” (27). Despite this problem, the modern world has taken science, and (by extension) technology as having “ushered in a new world view” (28)—they have become privileged and their above-noted limits have become systematically entrenched in culture, causing problems which he’ll go on to describe in Part 2 in terms of the device paradigm.

=== Part 2 ===
Part 1 of Borgmann's book gave background information and began to argue that how the modern world relates to technology follows a pattern, which he calls the device paradigm. Part 2, starting with chapters 8-12, goes into more depth regarding this phenomenon.

Chapter 8, “The Promise of Technology,” describes the beginnings of how the world began to rely so heavily on technology to begin with. Through the Enlightenment and then the Industrial Revolution, humanity began to believe that technology was the key to “liberation from toil and the advancement of literacy, eating, and health” (38). With technology's “promise” thus in place—and he's careful to note some value and truth in said promise—it gradually took the prominence that led to the pattern in question.

Chapter 9, “The Device Paradigm,” consequently spells out the first main part of Borgmann's entire thesis directly: we now operate according to the device paradigm, where things have become devices. By this, he means that whereas we once acquired goods via use of things, which are “inseparable from . . . engagement,” we now get commodities via devices, which remove the “encumbrance of or the engagement with a context” (41, 47). As an example of the thing/device distinction, he offers a hearth—a thing with context that gives more than just the commodity of heat, e.g., togetherness—and a central heating plant, which does nothing but supply a commodity (41-42). Borgmann argues that insofar as we have become reliant upon devices in this sense, “the coherent and engaging character of the pretechnological world of things” has been jeopardized (47).

Chapter 10, “The Foreground of Technology,” seeks to present “the global effect of the paradigm” just described (48). Borgmann accomplishes this goal by focusing on more examples of the device paradigm in action, by exploring how advertising highlights the pattern, and by noting how people tend to now equate “real and simulated experiences” (55). He concludes that “we are more confident of our means”—our technological devices which allow us to acquire commodities easily—“than of our ends,” which have become diluted by the device paradigm, and which now include technology itself more than experiences, as it once was (56).

Chapters 11-12 attempt to “give the intuitive and descriptive account of the technological pattern a measure of systematic firmness and clarity” (57). In other words, these two chapters are more philosophical basis for the “intuitive and descriptive account” of the previous chapters. Basically, Borgmann here looks at “alternative models and perspectives” regarding technology—those of Arendt, Tribe, Walker, Kuhn, Winner, Billington, etc.—and at paradigm as a means of knowing/explaining in general, concluding that “the technological device can be discerned in seemingly conflicting contentions about the significance of machines, means, and ends in technology,” and that “the device paradigm reveals more clearly than any other just how and to what extent people move away from engagement” (57, 68, 77). Finally, he notes that his “demonstration” of this main part of his thesis “can attain at least a measure of cogency,” and thus moves to the topic of Chapters 13-16, dealing with “society and politics” (78).

Chapters 13-16 of Borgmann's text rest upon the assumption that “we should bring [the device paradigm] to the surface and to our attention” in all areas, and consequently that “we should judge society and politics in light of technology” (78). “Technology and the Social Order,” Chapter 13, thus makes several moves from this starting point.

First, Borgmann argues that “there is a problem of orientation in the technologically advanced countries”—“many analysts of the technological society are concerned about the progressive erosion of standards” (79). People, through politics, attempt to address this by “raising the question of values,” however, technology “is never in question” and is always “the means that allow us to realize our preferred values”—the “good life” (80). Borgmann then preemptively answers Marxist critics who would argue for economics over technology as primary in politics, concluding that “the positive goal of the good life that [Marxists] advance is in accord with the dubious promise of technology” (85). In other words, the device paradigm operates on society in an even deeper way than economics, so one must “turn to the examination of liberal democracy to throw light on the ways in which technology has come to rule our lives,” since it is within liberal democracy that technology has typically acquired such power (85).

Chapter 14, “Technology and Democracy,” is a key chapter in which Borgmann basically argues that the values of democracy “can be realized jointly only according to the pattern of technology” (86). This conclusion is couched within a close reading of Dworkin and the meaning of democracy itself, but page 92 makes clear: “Liberal democracy is enacted as technology. It does not leave the question of the good life open but answers it along technological lines . . . Technology developed into a definite style of life.” This “style of life” is one in which “it becomes possible to style and restyle one’s life by assembling and disassembling commodities” (92). Simply put, democracy values equality and choice—this is exactly the promise of technology: all things, available simply, available to all.

Chapter 15, “The Rule of Technology,” seeks to determine if there are “empirical findings” on the question of technology's argued-for power in politics and society. Borgmann quickly surveys representative data, which he argues “is compatible with the relation to technology that has been explicated above” (106). Basically, people have “trust or hope in technology,” though this doesn't necessarily equate to more political or social good (106). Chapter 16 finishes this four chapter section by showing how the device paradigm explains “political apathy and the persistence of social injustice” (107). First, technology drives political apathy by virtue of its tendency to create general voter contentment, and because “technological politics . . . engenders no searching debates of the good life,” having already located it in availability and consumption as described in Chapter 14 (107-109). Second, “inequality favors the advancement and stability of the reign of technology”—“stages of affluence” created by inequality only support a consumption lifestyle, which is an effect of the device paradigm (112). He concludes this four chapter section by noting that “politics is merely the metadevice of the technological order” . . . it cannot lead to the good life because it cannot escape the determination of the device paradigm, which inevitably only supports its own socio-political effects (113).

Chapters 17-19 are the culmination Borgmann's Part 2 and aim to “give the present account of technology more depth” (114). In other words, now that the device paradigm has been presented, explained, etc., Borgmann wants to finish the section off—in the context of labor and leisure—by “exhibit[ing] in them how technology has led to a radical transformation of the human condition” (114).

Chapter 17, “Work and Labor,” begins by stating the book's basic take on the topic: “Roughly speaking, the reduction of work in technology to a mere means has resulted in the degradation of most work to what I usually will call labor” (114). The primary reason for this “reduction” and “degradation,” according to Borgmann, is the “division of work”—the splitting of once unified tasks by skilled craftspeople into numerous, disparate tasks (115). After tracing this state of affairs from pretechnological times through the Industrial Revolution and to today, and explaining that it has led to “disengagement” and “expansion of unskilled labor,” Borgmann seeks to explain why people still seem to value work, though it is becoming “more and more degraded and disliked” (118). Following this explanation—which ties together multiple issues, all related to how the device paradigm clouds our perception of once focal activities, in this case, work—he moves to the chapter's finish: the only reason we’re in this predicament regarding labor is because part of the “promise of technology” has always been to alleviate labor, and so we take an attitude of “complicity” to the effects of its supposedly doing so, and will likely continue to do so until the inevitable “widespread elimination of work,” which begins with its already-in-progress “degradation” (120-124).

Chapter 18's key (“Leisure, Excellence, and Happiness")is that “avowed happiness appears to decline as technological affluence rises” (124). This is an issue because, along with making work easier, “the promise of technology” has also always included in it the promise of more leisure, which supposedly leads to more happiness. Borgmann spends multiple pages explaining exactly how and why happiness is in decline, all in context of what most people take to be “the good life,” and always in relation to technology's role (125-128). After rejecting alternate explanations for this decline in happiness, he turns to the device paradigm for what he considers the superior explanation. Since “the primary context of pretechnological life that suffered decomposition function by function was the household” because of technology, according to Borgmann it follows that leisure—which is most often associated with one's “free time” at home—also has fallen prey to the degradation inherent in that division (136). We do find this to be the case, and Borgmann details how we “cope” with this problem, spending time talking about numerous issues related to family life: working families, entertainment, advertising, television (137-143)—the last of which he concludes the chapter with, arguing that “it provides a center for our leisure and an authority for the appreciation of commodities. It is also a palliative that cloaks the vacuity and relaxes the tensions of the technological condition” (143).

Chapter 19, “The Stability of Technology,” is a short chapter which seeks to finish off Part 2 by dealing with the question of “instabilities that have been discovered in technology” (144). Basically, given his critique, perhaps it would be better if technology were to disappear, or at least lose some influence. However, according to Borgmann, he finds “none of [the instabilities] fatal to the survival or affluence of the technological societies” (144). Why? Simply put, because “technology at its center is sufficiently resourceful to cope with its supposed flaws” (145). He goes on to explain how in several contexts. For example, the “spaceship earth” concept “provides the conceptual framework that makes it possible to deal technologically with the physical limits to growth, and it provides the rhetoric to make the technological solutions widely understandable and acceptable” (147). When the actual physical limits of the planet, in other words, seem to endanger technology, it finds a way to make the planet itself a device to be managed and sustained. The chapter and Part 2 end with a fascinating number of pages in which Borgmann tries to prognosticate on the topic of the upcoming (for him in 1984) “microelectronic revolution”—i.e., e.g., computers (148-153). The book has an admirably forward-looking sense of how big microelectronics will impact this entire issue, and ends by arguing—unsurprisingly—that they will be, however, “not revolutionary at all” “in another sense,” because they will only serve to further entrench the device paradigm. He thus ends by noting the need for “counterforces to technology,” the “focal practices” which will be the concern of Part 3 (153).

=== Part 3 ===
Chapter 20 of Borgmann's book begins the task of Part 3, which can be summed up simply: “Focal things and practices can empower us to propose and perhaps to enact a reform of technology” (155). Its specific role is “distinguishing reforms within the paradigm of technology from reforms of the paradigm” (157). Consequently, he spends several pages dismissing attempts within the paradigm: “the endeavor to find a new order at the heart of technology” (159), Pirsig’s Zen and the Art of Motorcycle Maintenance (1974) (160), etc. Then he differentiates between reforms within and of (162), explains the differences in the “kinds of problems” the two approaches face (164), and concludes that the “appropriate technology movement” is a good one, but that “technology will be appropriated . . . when it is related to a center” (167-168).

That center begins to take focus in Chapter 21, which aims to show that what Borgmann calls “deictic discourse” is the best way to “reopen the question of the good life” (169)—code for his project to reform technology—as differentiated from apodeictic and paradeictic discourse. Basically, deictic discourse has to do with passionately and enthusiastically speaking truth, with hopes to sway others towards it (175-178). In contrast, apodeictic discourse mainly concerns scientific and paradeictic paradigmatic explanations—different from the more personal, artful discourse he contends for here. Finally, he concludes that “deictic explanation is not only compatible with apodeictic and paradeictic explanations but is complementary to them. The former provides the orientation that the latter normally presuppose and require” (181), thus arguing for technology's reform must be done in this context.

Borgmann directs deictic discourse toward nature, arguing that pristine wilderness exemplifies a focal power outside the framework of technology. He asserts that engaging with focal things and practices enables individuals to critically reform technological engagement, fostering human maturity through self-imposed limits and intentional focus.

This “rightful discipline” takes shape finally in the climactic chapter of perhaps the whole book, Chapter 23, “Focal Things and Practices.” What are focal things? He defines them variously, but they hearken back to the Roman understanding of focus, meaning “hearth” (196). A focus (and focal things) “gathers the relations of its context and radiates into its surroundings and informs them. To focus on something or to bring it into focus is to make it central, clear, and articulate” (197). Borgmann considers wilderness, but also “music, gardening, the culture of the table, or running” to be among these things that “provide a center of orientation; when we bring the surrounding technology into it, our relations to technology become clarified and well-defined” (197). Now the thesis of the book becomes clear: “if we recognize the central vacuity of advanced technology”—what has been the point of Parts 1 and 2—“that emptiness can become the opening for focal things” focused on in Part 3 (199).

However, today focal things are “inconspicuous” and have “suffered a diaspora” (199). Borgmann goes on to argue that this is because “focal things can prosper in human practices only” (200). This is due, first, to “the mistaken assumption that the shaping of our lives can be left to a series of individual decisions” (206)—in other words, we don't “establish and commit oneself to a practice” involving focal things (207). Secondly, we often, even in participating in focal things and practices, make them means to ends as technology does. Borgmann offers the examples of running and the “culture of the table” to discuss how focal things and practices are to be enjoyed simply for their centering force in and of themselves (202-206). He concludes the chapter by noting that “Countering technology through a practice is to take account of our susceptibility to technological distraction, and it is also to engage the peculiarly human strength of comprehension, i.e., the power to take in the world in its extent and significance and to respond through an enduring commitment” (210), before previewing the book's final section, which will deal with defending and further examining this chapter's arguments.

The final section of Borgmann's book aims to deal with “important objections regarding focal practices” and with clarifying how focal practices are related “to our everyday world” (210).

Chapter 24, “Wealth and the Good Life,” deals first with objections and then with the issue of how the good life is to be achieved through focal practice, as opposed to through technology, as it promises. The first issue, as he sees it, has to do with “an evident plurality of focal concerns” (212). If everyone has different focal practices, how can they unify us and constitute a reform of technology? Borgmann deals with this by explaining that specific focal practices are to be appreciated and accepted as long as they fall under the “heading of engagement”—involving “skills,” “discipline,” “sensibility,” “interaction”—and “engagement is variously realized by various people” (214).

He continues this chapter by noting what types of things would fit this criterion, exploring differences between embodied and disembodied practices, purely technological practices (like video gaming), relating the discussion to Aristotle’s understandings of complexity and the good life, and wondering about religion as a possible unifier of varied practices (215-218). The chapter concludes with an exploration of how focal practices “serve as a basis for the reform of technology” (219), concluding that “the present proposal is to restrict the entire paradigm, both the machinery and the commodities, to the status of a means and let focal things and practices be our ends” (220). Several “concrete consequences” follow from this: “an intelligent and selective attitude toward technology,” “a distinct notion of the good life,” a “kind of prosperity,” “deepening of charity,” and the strengthening of the family (221-226).

Chapter 25 deals mainly with the issue of reforming the “national community,” as opposed to the realm of “privacy and of the family” dealt with in Chapter 24 (226). This can be done mainly through “deictic discourse . . . moral evaluation and eventually transformation” (228) that centers on focal practices. This transformation, Borgmann explains, will involve both economic (228-232) and “social and empirical” (232-236) spheres. Following from this, he discusses how reform-via-focal-practice will affect work—“defining and securing a space for engaging work” (239), and what he calls the “perfect technological city” (242). Finally, he finishes the chapter by arguing that “if we center ourselves in focal practices, the worth of our lives will no longer be measured by the standard of living. The standard of excellence is now wealth of engagement” (245). This, he says, should be our guiding political principle.

Chapter 26 is a short, summative chapter, entitled “The Recovery of the Promise of Technology.” In it, Borgmann wraps-up his entire project by arguing for what he calls “metatechnological things and practices” (247). By this he means “affirmative and intelligent acceptance of technology,” such that “not only do focal concerns attain their proper splendor in the context of technology; the context of technology too is restored to the dignity of its original promise through the focal concerns at its center” (247-248). He finishes by noting, in regards to his reform project: “I hope it will prevail, and it sustains my hope” (249).
