= Everyday life =

Ways in which people typically act, think, and feel on a daily basis

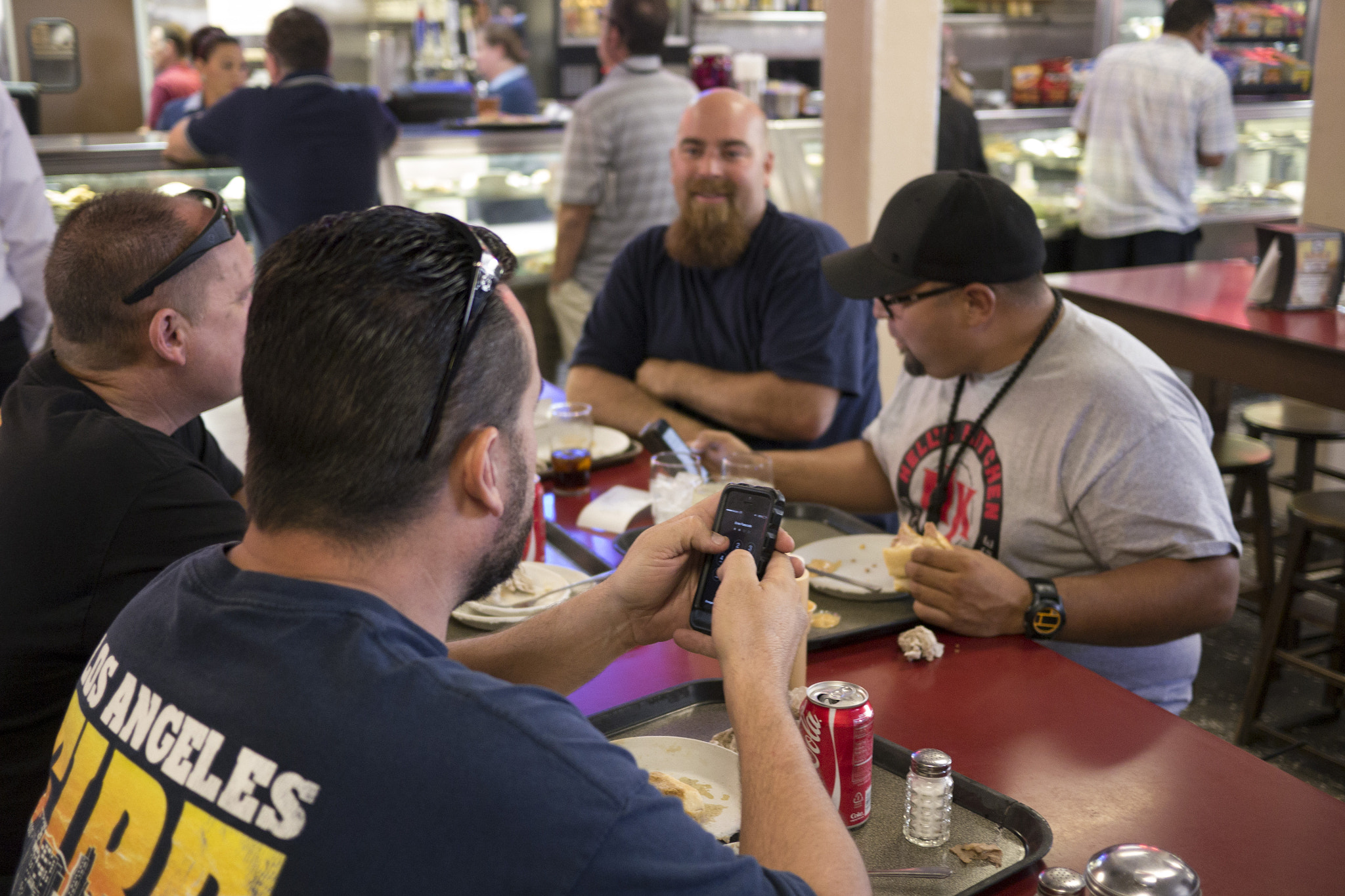
Candid photograph of four men eating breakfast, a morning routine

Everyday life, daily life or routine life comprises the ways in which people typically act, think, and feel on a daily basis. Everyday life may be described as mundane, routine, natural, habitual, or normal.

Human diurnality means most people sleep at least part of the night and are active in daytime. Most eat two or three meals in a day. Working time (apart from shift work) mostly involves a daily schedule, beginning in the morning. This produces the daily rush hours experienced by many millions, and the drive time focused on by radio broadcasters. Evening is often leisure time. Bathing every day – possibly by taking a shower – is a custom for many.

Beyond these broad similarities, lifestyles vary and different people spend their days differently. For example, nomadic life differs from sedentism, and among the sedentary, urban people live differently from rural folk. Differences in the lives of the rich and the poor, or between laborers and intellectuals, may go beyond their working hours. Children and adults also vary in what they do each day.

== Sociological perspectives ==
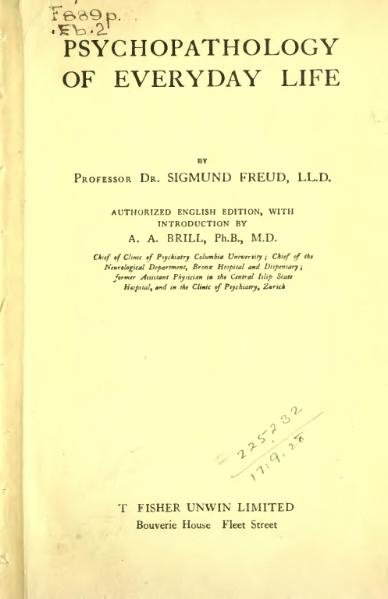
The Psychopathology of Everyday Life

Everyday life is a key concept in cultural studies and is a specialized subject in the field of sociology. Some argue that, motivated by capitalism and industrialism's degrading effects on human existence and perception, writers and artists of the 19th century turned more towards self-reflection and the portrayal of everyday life represented in their writings and art to a noticeably greater degree than in past works, for example Renaissance literature's interest in hagiography and politics. Other theorists dispute this argument based on a long history of writings about daily life which can be seen in works from Ancient Greece, medieval Christianity and the Age of Enlightenment.

In the study of everyday life, gender has been an important factor in its conceptions. Some theorists regard women as the quintessential representatives and victims of everyday life.

The connotation of everyday life is often negative, and is distinctively separated from exceptional moments by its lack of distinction and differentiation. Ultimately this is defined as the essential, taken-for-granted continuum of mundane activity that outlines forays into more esoteric experiences. It is the non-negotiable reality that exists amongst all social groupings without discrimination and is an unavoidable basis for which all human endeavor exists.

Much of everyday life is automatic in that it is driven by current environmental features as mediated by automatic cognitive processing of those features, and without any mediation by conscious choice, according to social psychologist John A. Bargh. Daily life is also studied by sociologists to investigate how it is organised and given meaning. A sociological journal called the Journal of Mundane Behavior, published from 2000 to 2004, studied these everyday actions.

== Leisure ==
Daily entertainment once consisted mainly of telling stories in the evening. This custom developed into the theatre of ancient Greece and other professional entertainments. Reading later became less a mysterious specialty of scholars, and more a common pleasure for people who could afford books. During the 20th century mass media became prevalent in rich countries, creating among other things a daily prime time to consume fiction and other professionally produced works.

Different media forms serve different purposes in different individuals' everyday lives—which gives people the opportunities to make choices about what media form(s)—watching television, using the Internet, listening to the radio, or reading newspapers or magazines—most effectively help them to accomplish their tasks. Many people have steadily increased their daily use of the Internet, over all other media forms.

== Language ==
People's everyday lives are shaped through language and communication. They choose what to do with their time based on opinions and ideals formed through the discourse they are exposed to. Much of the dialogue people are subject to comes from the mass media, which is an important factor in what shapes human experience. The media uses language to make an impact on one's everyday life, whether that be as small as helping to decide where to eat or as big as choosing a representative in government.

To improve people's everyday life, Phaedra Pezzullo, professor in the Department of Communication and Culture at Indiana University Bloomington, says people should seek to understand the rhetoric that so often and unnoticeably changes their lives. She writes that "...rhetoric enables us to make connections... It's about understanding how we engage with the world".

== Activities of daily living ==
Activities of daily living (ADL) is a term used in healthcare to refer to daily self care activities within an individual's place of residence, in outdoor environments, or both. Health professionals routinely refer to the ability or inability to perform ADLs as a measurement of the functional status of a person, particularly in regard to people with disabilities and the elderly. ADLs are defined as "the things we normally do...such as feeding ourselves, bathing, dressing, grooming, work, homemaking, and leisure". The ability and the extent to which the elderly can perform these activities is at the focus of gerontology and understandings of later life.

== See also ==
- Being in the World
- Existentiell
- Genre art
- Genre painting
- Homelessness
- Lifestyle (sociology)
- Lifeworld
- Personal life
- Realism (arts)
- Shibui
- Simple living
- Slice of life
- Technics and Time, 1
- Technology and the Character of Contemporary Life
- The Practice of Everyday Life
- The Revolution of Everyday Life

== Bibliography ==
- Wyer, Robert S.; Bargh, John A. (1997). The Automaticity of Everyday life. Lawrence Erlbaum Associates. ISBN 0805816992.
