= Achterhuis =

Achterhuis may refer to:

- Hans Achterhuis, Dutch philosopher
- The Anne Frank House in Amsterdam
- Het Achterhuis, the original Dutch title of The Diary of a Young Girl
