= Journal of Mundane Behavior =

- Discipline: Sociology
- Language: English
- Edited by: Scott Schaffer

Publication details
- History: 2000–2004
- Frequency: Triannual

Standard abbreviations
- ISO 4: J. Mundane Behav.

Indexing
- ISSN: 1529-3041
- LCCN: 00214452
- OCLC no.: 43635461

The Journal of Mundane Behavior was a triannual peer-reviewed academic journal of sociology covering everyday behavior and experiences. It was published online with three issues a year. The journal's first issue came out in February 2000 and the last issue appeared in 2004.

The journal was dedicated to exploring "the minor, redundant and commonplace scenes of life" and celebrating "the majesty of the obvious". The first issue included articles about the behavior of Japanese people on elevators, the arrangement of books on library shelves, and the social implications of facial hair. The journal reflected a recent trend among sociologists to "investigate the largely unconscious verbal and nonverbal conventions of everyday social interactions," in contrast to the field's historical focus on deviant behavior.

The editor-in-chief was Scott Schaffer (Millersville University of Pennsylvania). The original concept for the journal came from Schaffer and founding co-editor Myron Orleans (California State University, Fullerton). They were "inspired in part by an article in the scholarly journal Sociological Theory that called for closer inspection of those parts of life that we routinely ignore." The two universities co-hosted the site.
