= Gestell =

Philosophical term coined by Heidegger

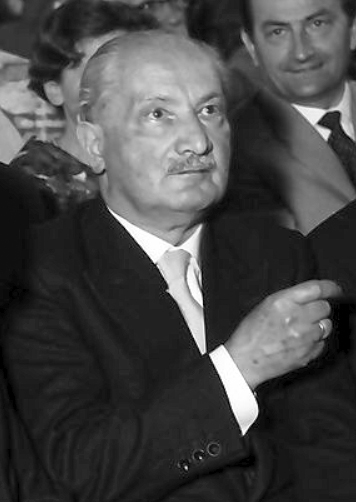
Martin Heidegger

Gestell (or Ge-stell, translated as "Enframing" or "positioning") is a German word used by twentieth-century German philosopher Martin Heidegger to describe what lies behind or beneath modern technology. Heidegger introduced the term in 1954 in "The Question Concerning Technology", a text based on the lecture "The Framework" ("Das Gestell") first presented on December 1, 1949, in Bremen. It was derived from the root word stellen, which means "to put" or "to place" and combined with the German prefix Ge-, which denotes a form of "gathering" or "collection". The term encompasses all types of entities and orders them in a certain way.

== Heidegger's notion of Gestell ==
Heidegger applied the concept of Gestell to his exposition of the essence of technology. He concluded that technology is fundamentally Gestell, Enframing (more recently translated as "positioning"). As such, the essence of technology is Gestell. Indeed, "Gestell, literally 'framing', is an all-encompassing view of technology, not as a means to an end, but rather a mode of human existence". Heidegger further explained that in a more comprehensive sense, the concept is the final mode of the historical self-concealment of primordial φύσις (physis, usually translated as 'nature').

In defining the essence of technology as Gestell, Heidegger indicated that all that has come to presence in the world has been enframed. Such enframing pertains to the manner reality appears or unveils itself in the period of modern technology and people born into this "mode of ordering" are always embedded into the Gestell (enframing). Thus what is revealed in the world, what has shown itself as itself (the truth of itself) required first an Enframing, literally a way to exist in the world, to be able to be seen and understood. Concerning the essence of technology and how we see things in our technological age, the world has been framed as the "standing-reserve." Heidegger writes,

Enframing means the gathering together of that setting-upon which sets upon man, i.e., challenges him forth, to reveal the real, in the mode of ordering, as standing-reserve. Enframing means that way of revealing which holds sway in the essence of modern technology and which is itself nothing technological.

Furthermore, Heidegger uses the word in a way that is uncommon by giving Gestell an active role. In ordinary usage, the word would signify simply a display apparatus of some sort, like a book rack or picture frame; but for Heidegger, Gestell is literally a challenging forth, or performative "gathering together", for the purpose of revealing or presentation. If applied to science and modern technology, "standing reserve" is active in the case of a river once it generates electricity, or the earth if revealed as a coal-mining district or the soil as a mineral deposit.

For some scholars, Gestell effectively explains the violence of technology. This is attributed to Heidegger's explanation that, when Gestell holds sway, "it drives out every other possibility of revealing" and that it "conceals that revealing which, in the sense of poiesis, lets what presences come forth into appearance."

== Later uses of the concept ==
Giorgio Agamben drew heavily from Heidegger in his interpretation of Foucault's concept of dispositif (apparatus). In his work, What is an Apparatus, he described apparatus as the "decisive technical term in the strategy of Foucault's thought". Agamben maintained that Gestell is nothing more than what appears as oikonomia. Agamben cited cinema as an apparatus of Gestell since films capture and record the gestures of human beings.

Roberto Esposito also uses Heidegger to reinterpret Foucault’s concept of dispositif. In Two, Esposito draws from Heidegger’s Bremen Lectures to examine the “dispositif of the person” and the “machine of political theology.” Heidegger’s Gestell, he argues, addresses a key tension in the modern human between ordering-positioning and producing-creating. Although the technical mechanisms threaten to obstruct the process of disclosure (Aletheia), they also preserve the dignity of the productive and creative aspects of the modern human (poiesis). This tension rests at the centre of many accounts of dispositifs in contemporary philosophy. In fact, the four main characteristics outlined in Esposito's reading of the Gestell—elusiveness, concealment, inclusionary power, and subjectification—are repeated by most philosophies of dispositifs.

Albert Borgmann expanded Heidegger's concept of Gestell by offering a more practical conceptualization of the essence of technology. Heidegger's enframing became Borgmann's device paradigm, which explains the intimate relationship between people, things, and technological devices.

Claudio Ciborra developed another interpretation, which focused on the analysis of the Information System infrastructure using the concept of Gestell. He based his improvement of the original meaning of "structural" with "processual" on the etymology of Gestell so that it indicates the pervasive process of arranging, regulating, and ordering of resources that involve both human and natural resources. Ciborra has likened information infrastructure with Gestell and this association was used to philosophically ground many aspects of his works such as his description of its inherent self-feeding process.

== See also ==
- Framing (social sciences)
- Dispositif
