= Hans Achterhuis =

Dutch philosopher

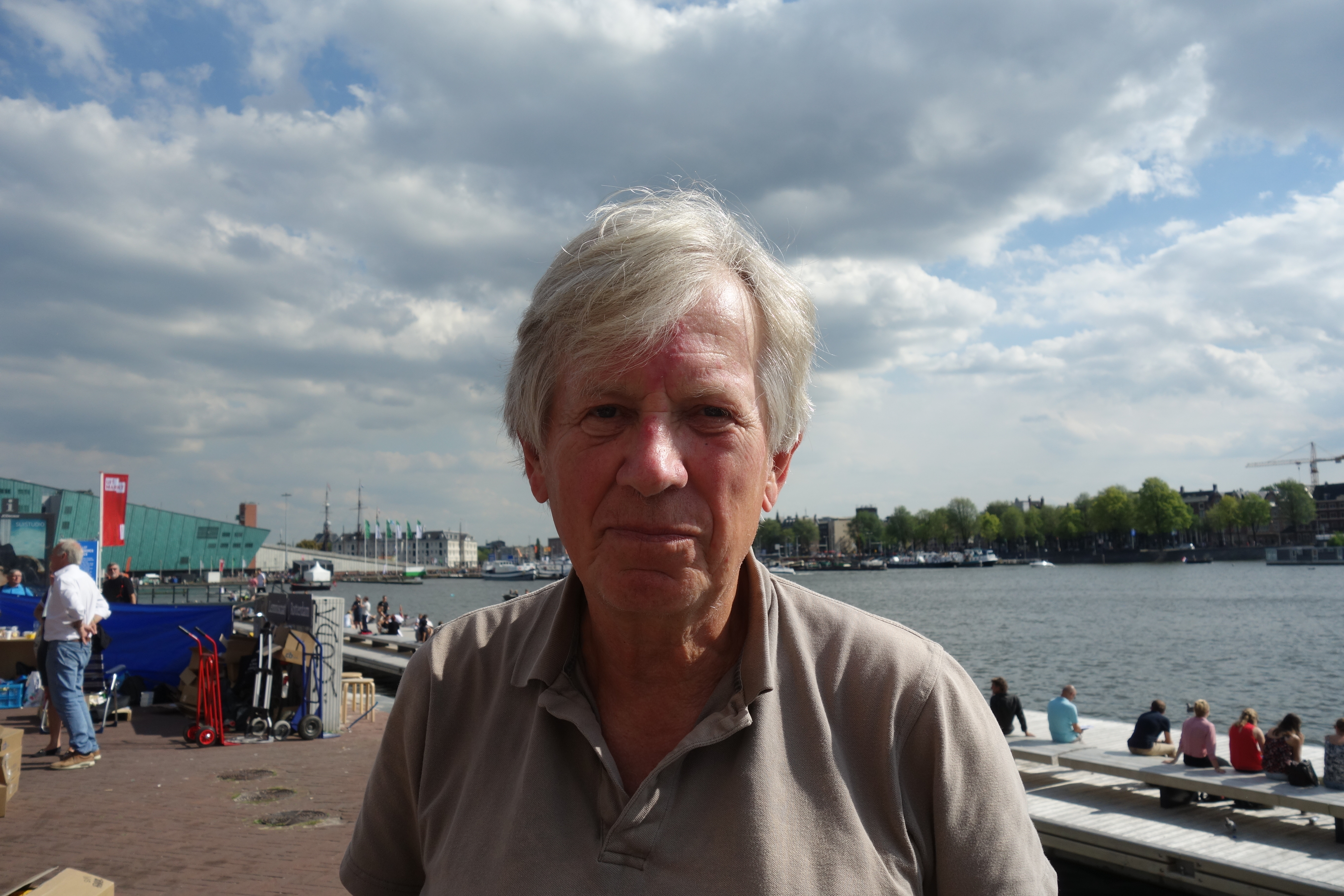
Hans Achterhuis (2017)

Herman Johan "Hans" Achterhuis (born September 1, 1942, Hengelo) is Professor Emeritus in Systematic Philosophy at the University of Twente, The Netherlands. For now his research concerns particularly social and political philosophy and philosophy of technology.

His list of publications shows a great scope (in fields of medical care, labour, third-world-philosophy). In 1967, he took his doctoral degree on Albert Camus.

His latest books handle the topics of utopianism (‘De erfenis van de utopie’, ‘The Legacy of Utopia’) and the tension between morality and politics in relation to the Kosovo War (“Politiek van Goede bedoelingen’, ‘Policy of good intentions’). He is co-author of the volume American Philosophy of Technology; The Empirical Turn. This work includes contributions on Albert Borgmann, Hubert Dreyfus, Andrew Feenberg, Donna Haraway, Don Ihde and Langdon Winner.

== Main thoughts ==
His ideas add up to a philosophy of things (objects) and a plea for a morality of machines. Rather than being morally neutral, things guide our behaviour (barriers in the subway forcing us to buy a ticket). This is why they are capable of exerting moral pressure that is much more effective than imposing sanctions or trying to reform the way people think. Utopia has been superseded but the world can still be improved, if we take seriously our moral ties to the machines and devices that surround us.

== Philosopher Laureate ==
In 2011 Achterhuis was chosen as the first Philosopher Laureate of the Netherlands (Dutch: Denker des Vaderlands (Thinker of the Fatherland), nl). This honorary title was an initiative of the Filosofie magazine, and the Stichting Maand van de Filosofie (Philosophy Month Foundation), together with the Dutch newspaper Trouw. The person is chosen by a group of journalists and academics. The aim of the initiative is to allow a philosophy heavyweight to speak in the media, to place news events in a broader context. In 2013 Achterhuis was succeeded as Philosopher Laureate by René Gude (Surabaja, 2 March 1957 – Amsterdam, 13 March 2015).

== Publications ==
=== in Dutch ===
- Achterhuis, H.J. (1995) De utopie en haar verschijningsvorm (Utopia and its manifestation), Amsterdam. Lumiance Lecture. Haarlem: Lumiance. Text of the sixth Lumiance Lezing (Lecture) delivered on 24 September 1995 in Paradiso, Amsterdam.
- Achterhuis, H.J. (1997). Van Stoommachine tot cyborg; denken over techniek in de nieuwe wereld. Amsterdam: Ambo. pp. 7–16. ISBN 9789026314964. OCLC 68285962. 160 p.
- Achterhuis, H.J. (1999). De erfenis van de utopie. Erasmus-lezing. Utrecht: Stichting Erasmus Liga. OCLC 67912999. Earlier 1998 edition with publisher Baarn; Ambo: 444 pp.
- Achterhuis, H.J. (2017). Met alle geweld: Een filosofische zoektocht (in Dutch) (3rd ed.). Rotterdam: Lemniscaat. ISBN 9789047701279. OCLC 1010943035. First edition was of 2008 with the same publisher.
- Achterhuis, H.J. (2015). De utopie van de vrije markt. Rotterdam: Lemniscaat. ISBN 9789047702573. OCLC 908238425. First edition was of 2010 with the same publisher.

=== in Italian ===
- Achterhuis, H.J. (1995). "La responsabilità tra il timore e l'utopia". In Hottois, G.; Pinsart, M.G. (eds.). Hans Jonas. Natura e responsabilità. Collana del Dipartimento di Filosofia dell'Università degli Studi di Lecce : Sezione saggi (in Italian). Lecce, Italy: Edizioni Milella. pp. 99–110. ISBN 9788870482805. OCLC 895420785.

=== in English ===
- Achterhuis, H.J. (1995). "The History and Roots of Growth". In van Dieren, Wouter (ed.). Taking nature into account : toward a sustainable national income : a report to the Club of Rome. New York, NY: Copernicus. pp. 15–27. OCLC 905474106. Translated into Dutch, German, French, Spanish, Italian, and Japanese)
- Achterhuis, H.J.; Crease, Robert P., eds. (2001). American Philosophy of Technology: the Empirical Turn. Bloomington/Minneapolis: Indiana University Press. ISBN 9780253339034. OCLC 905582614.
