= Dispositif =

Philosophical term

Dispositif is one of the most prevalent concepts in 20th and 21st century philosophy, especially in Continental philosophy. As a philosophical term, dispositif has been introduced into the English language via the work of Michel Foucault, although there is now an extensive literature covering the much broader genealogy of dispositifs in contemporary philosophy. In general, they are a complex arrangement of discursive and non-discursive elements, which produce our world, subject positions, and ways of understanding. In the words of Gilles Deleuze, they are "machines that make one see and speak." Power is productive in dispositifs, which not only capture, control, and orient subjects, but also create openings for resistance (either through counter-dispositifs or by rendering them inoperative). Dispositifs are used by scholars in a number of disciplines, including anthropology, art history, communication studies, cultural studies, feminism, film studies, geography, linguistics, literary theory, organization theory, political science, queer theory, science and technology studies, and sociology.

== Translation issues ==
Translation issues remain a key point of contention in the English literature on dispositifs. Various translations have been used for this French word such as "apparatus", "assemblage", "arrangement", "construction", "deployment", "device", "enframing", "formation", "machinery", "mechanism", "procedure", "syntactic", and "system".

Apparatus and Hand
- Artist: Salvador Dalí
- Year: 1927
- Medium: oil on panel
- Location: Salvador Dalí Museum, St. Petersburg, United States

In the English translation of Foucault's first volume of the History of Sexuality: The Will to Knowledge, Robert Hurley translated the "dispositif de sexualité" as "deployment of sexuality". Later English translators started using "apparatus" for such texts as Giorgio Agamben's "What is an Apparatus?" (Che cos'è un dispositivo?), or as a "social apparatus" in Gilles Deleuze's "What is a Dispositif?" ("Qu'est-ce qu'un dispositif?").

In his essay on dispositifs, Agamben notes that there are generally three different senses of dispositif in French: juridical, technological, and militaristic. English commentators have noted that these senses are lost on English readers, where "dispositive" merely retains an arcane legal meaning (the legal disposition of a deceased person's property in their deed or will). The act of disposing (from disponere) is expressed in this word, but it falls short of conveying the broader senses implied in the French dispositif.

Authors have also pointed out that "apparatus" is an inappropriate translation. A dispositif is not the same as an (appareil). Apparatus is a technical term which does not convey the broader array of meanings or the etymological connotations of (disponere), implied in dispositif. Commentators have argued that a single dispositif often consists of multiple apparatuses. Others have argued that a dispositif is more comprehensive than earlier, largely discursive and technical, uses of appareil in French philosophy, such as Louis Althusser's ideological or state apparatus and the cinematic application of it by Jean-Louis Baudry with apparatus theory. Since the publication of Agamben's essay, many English authors are now either translating it into English as "dispositif" or simply retaining it in French as dispositif, while a few have elected to use "dispositive".

== Philosophical genealogy ==
Untitled (on vous intoxique!)
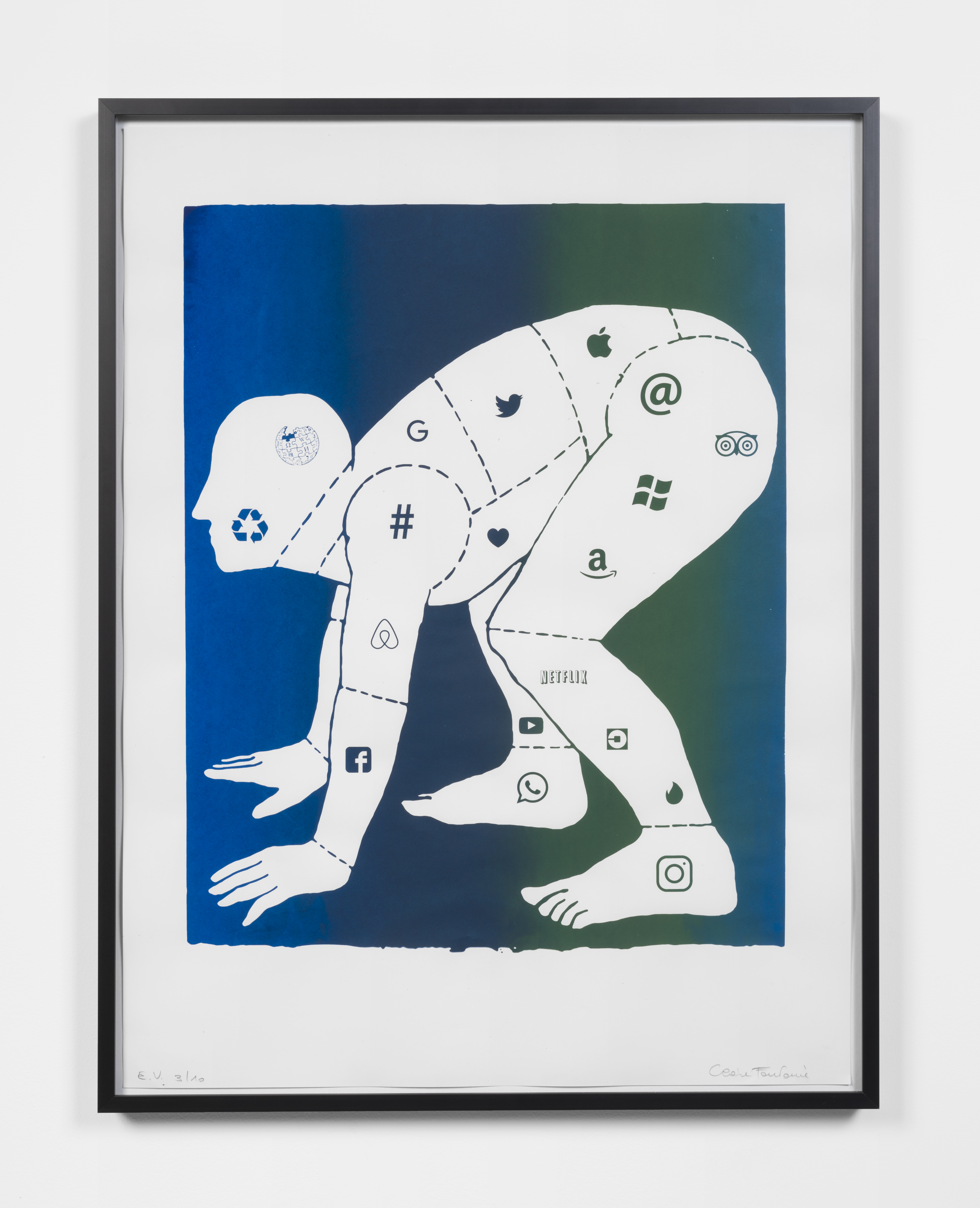
- Artist: Claire Fontaine
- Year: 2018
- Medium: Silkscreen on newsprint
- Website: www.clairefontaine.ws

Foucault was not the first philosopher to use dispositifs. In contemporary philosophy, the genealogy of dispositifs has been subjected to much debate and speculation. The term has been compared with Foucault's former teacher Louis Althusser's concept of Ideological state apparatuses; yet, Foucault incorporated dispositifs in his research in order to account for the productive and material dimensions of power/knowledge. For these reasons, others have traced the genealogy of dispositifs back to such concepts as Jean Hyppolite's notion of positivité, Martin Heidegger's Gestell (enframing), Jean-François Lyotard's early 1970s studies on the Libidinal Economy, Georges Canguilhem's notion of "social normativity" (1966) and his use of the term dispositif in "Machine and Organism" (1952), even Karl Marx's "assemblage of machinery" in "The Fragment on Machines".

== Foucault ==
In the 1970s, Foucault's research shifted from archaeological analysis to genealogical investigations. The archaeological method focused on discursive statements and archives (see episteme), whereas the genealogical approach re-centres the problem of the production of knowledge around questions of power and is grounded in an institutional analysis. “The transition from episteme to dispositif,” claims Yuk Hui, “is a strategic move to a more immanent critique, which Foucault was able to apply in a more contemporary analysis.” Foucault's dispositifs, notes Judith Revel, "include institutions and practices, that is, 'all the non-discursive social aspects.'" During his later stages of research, Foucault deployed dispositifs to examine how the discursive and material dimensions of power/knowledge are assembled together in a heterogeneous network of instruments, procedures, techniques, and strategies. "[A]ll social institutions" are treated as dispositifs, notes Jacques Bidet, "that is to say, as relations of power, which is always the power of some over others, in the concreteness of 'technologies,' material assemblages and discursive formations."

In many of Foucault's lectures at the Collège de France, he refers to dispositifs in general terms, such as a "dispositif of power" (dispositif de pouvoir) or a "dispositif of power-knowledge." Dispositifs played a central role in Discipline and Punish and in The History of Sexuality, volume one. In the former, he periodically refers to disciplinary power as a dispositif (dispositif disciplinaire), and he describes the panopticon as a dispositif (dispositif panopitique). His most sustained analysis of dispositifs is found in the closing chapters of The History of Sexuality. Part Four is entitled "Le dispositif of sexualité" ("Deployment of Sexuality"). In these pages he provides a rough genealogical sketch of how the dispositif of sexuality emerges out the "dispositif d'alliance" ("deployment of alliance"), while the final chapter outlines the relationship between dispositifs and biopower. Foucault also mentions several types of dispositifs in his Collège de France lectures during this period, such as the "dispositif of security" (Security, Territory, Population) and the "dispositif of governmentality" (The Birth of Biopolitics).

Throughout the 1970s, Foucault offered multiple and lengthy descriptions of dispositifs, but he was reluctant to define them in clear and concise terms. The lack of any clear definition, and the elusive nature of dispositifs themselves, is one of the most discussed topics in the literature on dispositifs. Michel de Certeau, for example, claims that Foucault employed a "variety of synonyms, words that dance about and successfully approach an impossible proper name: 'apparatuses' [dispositifs], 'instrumentalities,' 'techniques,' 'mechanisms,' 'machineries,' etc."

Foucault's most descriptive account of dispositifs is found in "The Confession of the Flesh" 1977 interview. Foucault was asked to clarify the meaning of dispositif in his "dispositif of sexuality": "What is the meaning or methodological function for you of this term, apparatus (dispositif)?" Foucault responds, "What I'm trying to pick out with this term is,

[F]irstly, a thoroughly heterogeneous ensemble consisting of discourses, institutions, architectural forms, regulatory decisions, laws, administrative measures, scientific statements, philosophical, moral and philanthropic propositions—in short, the said as much as the unsaid. Such are the elements of the apparatus. The apparatus itself is the system of relations that can be established between these elements.

Secondly, what I am trying to identify in this apparatus is precisely the nature of the connection that can exist between these heterogeneous elements. Thus, a particular discourse can figure at one time as the programme of an institution, and at another it can function as a means of justifying or masking a practice which itself remains silent, or as a secondary re-interpretation of this practice, opening out for it a new field of rationality. In short, between these elements, whether discursive or non-discursive, there is a sort of interplay of shifts of position and modifications of function which can also vary very widely.

Thirdly, I understand by the term 'apparatus' a sort of—shall we say—formation which has as its major function at a given historical moment that of responding to an urgent need. The apparatus thus has a dominant strategic function.

— Michel Foucault, "The Confession of the Flesh"

Detroit Industry Murals
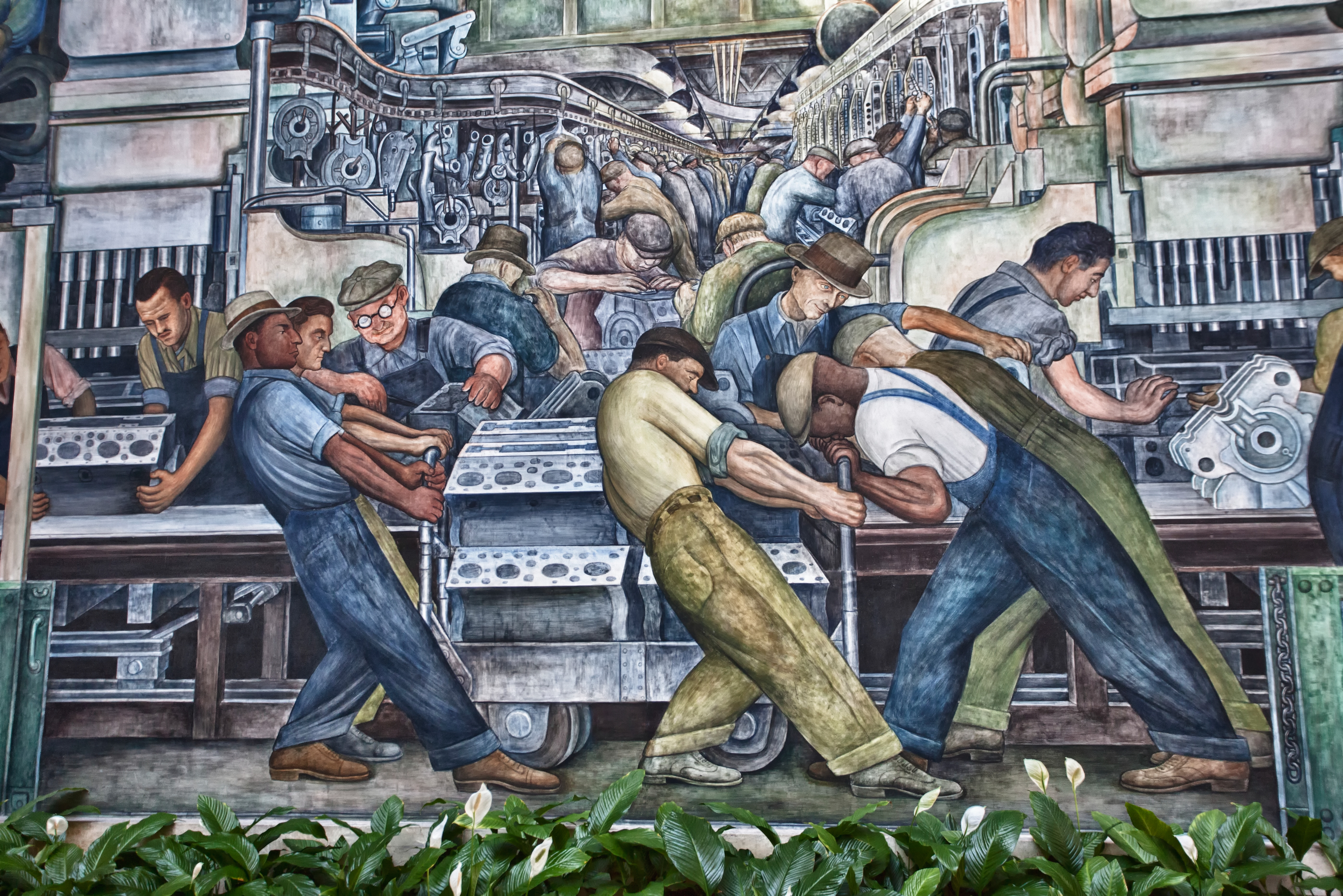
- Artist: Diego Rivera
- Year: 1932–1933
- Medium: Fresco
- Location: Detroit Institute of Arts, Detroit, United States
- Owner: User:Carptrash

In the follow-up responses, Foucault summarizes his meaning: dispositifs are "strategic" in their nature as they are "always inscribed in a play of power" and "linked to certain coordinates of knowledge." That is, power/knowledge are combined in dispositifs, which is a process he often referred to as the "dispositif of power/knowledge" during this stage of his writings.

In the same interview, Foucault is also asked to clarify the relationship between dispositifs and his archaeological concept episteme (épistémè), which in The Order of Things (1966) he describes as an a priori system of knowledge that grounds truth in discourse in a given epoch. Foucault states that "the episteme is a specifically discursive" dispositif, whereas a dispositif is a much broader and more heterogeneous device that consists of "discursive and non-discursive" elements.

== Interpretations ==
A core issue in this literature is the tension between the discursive and the non-discursive, or the immaterial and material, composition of dispositifs. The prevailing tendency in the early reception of Foucault's term was to interpret it in a strictly in discursive manner. This discursive reading was popularized in discourse analysis, which tended to reduce Foucault's insights to a largely social constructionism framework. One of the most prominent examples is Judith Butler's adaptation of Foucault's "dispositif of sexuality" to conceptualize gender as a discursive apparatus:

[G]ender must also designate the very apparatus of production whereby the sexes themselves are established... . [G]ender is also the discursive/cultural means by which "sexed nature" or "a natural sex" is produced and established as "prediscursive," prior to culture, a politically neutral surface on which culture acts... . This production of sex as the prediscursive ought to be understood as the effect of the apparatus of cultural construction designated by gender.

— Judith Butler, Gender Trouble

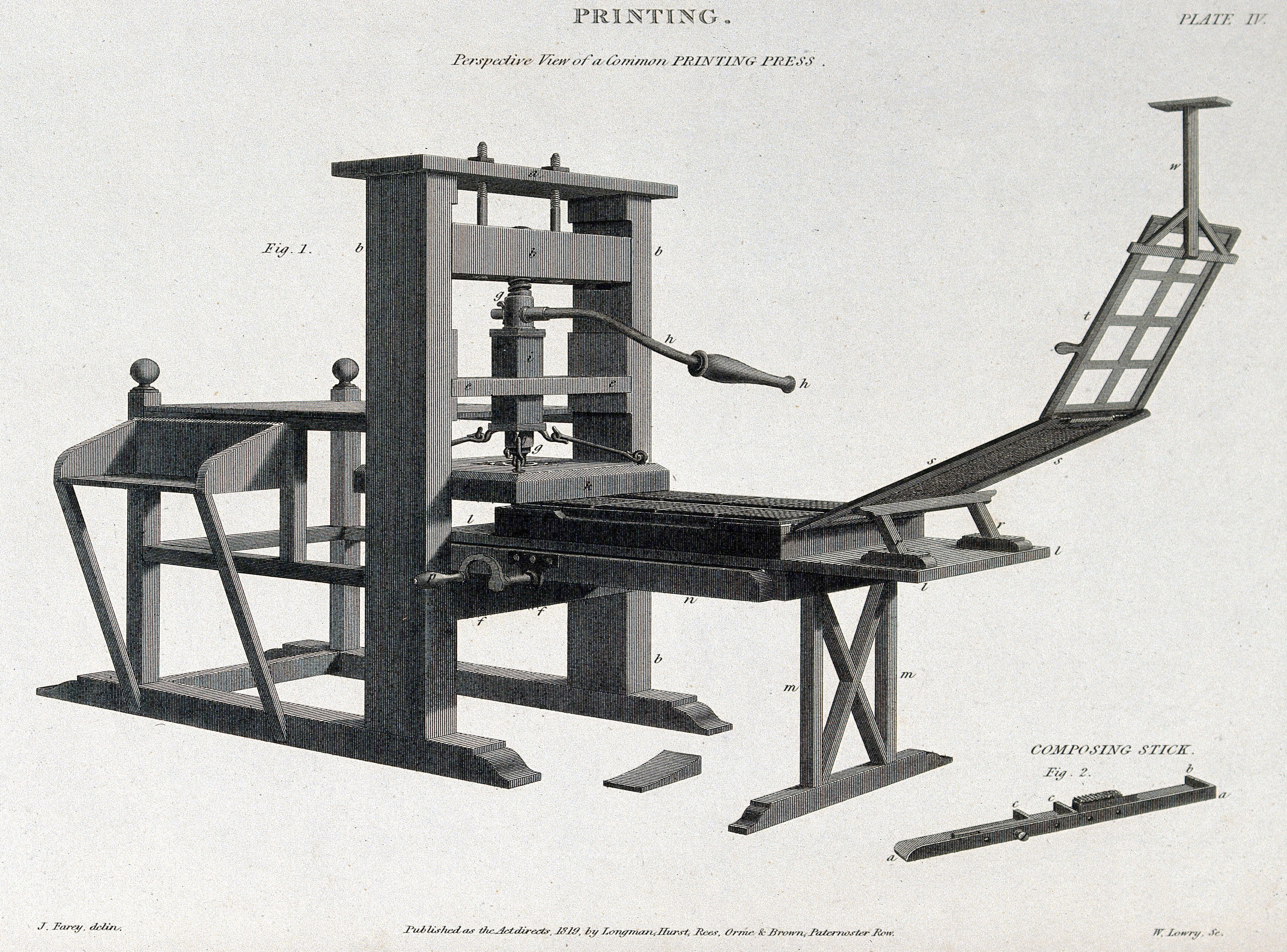
Printing press, engraving by W Lowry after mechanical engineer John Farey Jr., 1819

Jemima Repo criticizes Butler for overlooking "the historically specific technology of biopower", including "the strategies and tactics of biopower", which were central to Foucault's account of the dispositif of sexuality.

Giorgio Agamben traces the trajectory of dispositif (dispositivo in Italian) to Aristotle's oikonomia (οἰκονομία) as the effective management of the household and the early Christian Church Fathers' use of the oikonomia to save the concept of the Trinity from the allegation of polytheism. He argues that Foucault's dispositif is part of a larger, and broad-ranging "theological genealogy of economy," which he traces through the Christian theological dispositio, Hegel's notion of positivity, and Heidegger's Gestell. The oikonomia is "a set of practices, bodies of knowledge, measures, and institutions that aim to manage, govern, control, and orient—in a way that purports to be useful—the behaviours, gestures, and thoughts of human beings." In the next section of his essay, he defines dispositif as:

[L]iterally anything that has in some way the capacity to capture, orient, determine, intercept, model, control, or secure the gestures, behaviors, opinions, or discourses of living beings.

— Giorgio Agamben, "What is an Apparatus?"

Agamben provides a long list of examples, ranging from institutions such as prisons, factories, and schools to discursive devices such as pens, writing, literature, and cell phones. He also refers to "language itself" as "perhaps the most ancient of apparatuses—one in which thousands and thousands of years ago a primate inadvertently let himself be captured, probably without realizing the consequences that he was about to face." Matteo Pasquinelli has criticized Agamben for relying too much on philological analysis, while Gregg Lambert has questioned why Agamben has forced a largely theological interpretation onto what most others read as a primarily political concept.

Roberto Esposito traces the genealogy of dispositifs back to Martin Heidegger's theory of the Gestell. In Two: The Machine of Political Theology and the Place of Thought, Esposito draws from Heidegger's Bremen Lectures to examine the "dispositif of the person." Heidegger's Gestell, he argues, addresses a key tension in the human between ordering-positioning and producing-creating. Although the technical mechanisms threaten to obstruct the process of disclosure (Aletheia), they also preserve the dignity of the productive and creative aspects of the modern human (poiesis). This tension rests at the centre of many accounts of dispositifs in contemporary philosophy. In fact, the four main characteristics outlined in Esposito's reading of the Gestell—elusiveness, concealment, inclusionary power, and subjectification—are repeated by most philosophies of dispositifs.

Autodidact's Transport
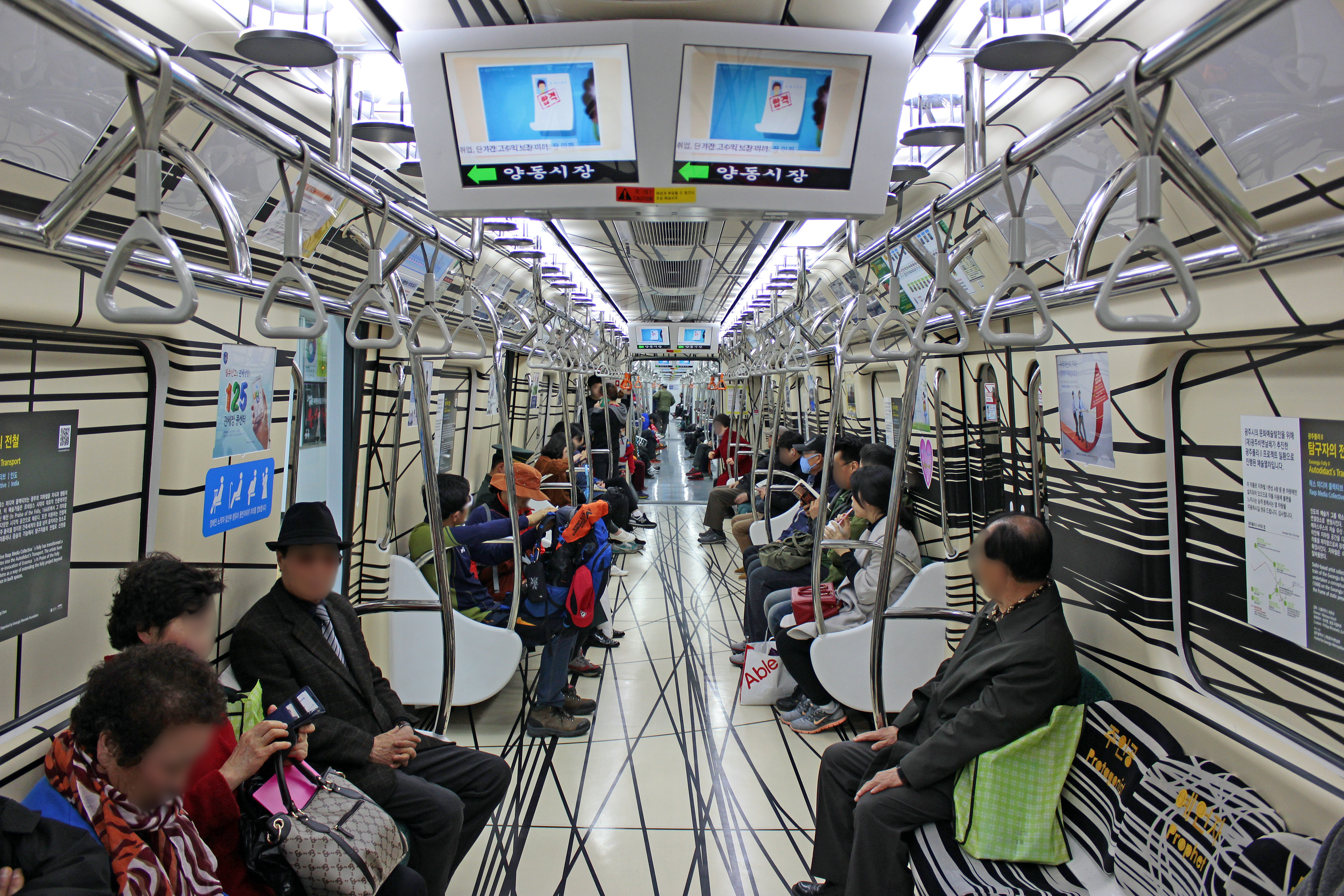
- Artist: Raqs Media Collective
- Year: 2015
- Medium: Public Art, Gwangju Metro System
- Location: Gwangju, South Korea
- Owner: Minseong Kim, CC BY-SA 4.0
- Website: raqsmediacollective.net

Others place their emphasis on how dispositifs are grounded in materiality. These readings focus on the mechanistic and productive dynamics of dispositifs. Key references here are Gilles Deleuze's description of dispositifs as "machines that make one see and speak", Gilbert Simondon's work on technical objects, and Marx's "Fragment on Machines". This reading includes various Italian post-operaismo theorists such as Antonio Negri and Michael Hardt in their in their Empire trilogy. Others include the anonymous collective Tiqqun, Jacques Bidet, artistic persona Claire Fontaine, Maurizio Lazzarato, and Hito Steyerl. A second, related, strain is also addressed by feminist and queer theorists who examine the material embodiment in dispositifs, which includes new materialism figures such as Karen Barad and Catherine Malabou and critics such as Nikki Sullivan. A third, interrelated strain is found in Assemblage (philosophy), and other philosophers of technology who adapted the paradigm of dispositifs into their research, such as Bernard Stiegler and Bruno Latour. Finally, in necropolitics key theorists such as Jasbir Puar and Achille Mbembe use dispositifs to articulate their core ideas. For example, Mbembe characterizes the slave plantation and the colony as “racial dispositifs” [dispositifs raciaux], and he describes race as a “security dispositif”:

Race, from this perspective, functions as a security device [dispositif de sécurité] based on what we can call the principle of biological rootedness of the species. The latter is at once an ideology and technology of governance.

— Achille Mbembe, Critique of Black Reason

Drawing from Marx's "Fragment on Machines" and Heidegger's "The Question Concerning Technology," Greg Bird argues that the "era of the dispositif is marked by an obsession with engineering," a "vast assemblage of machinery took hold of humanity.... [W]ays of thinking, seeing, desiring, doing, and being were radically reconfigured." Authors who use dispositifs continue to reproduce one central problematic, which he calls the "problem of engineering: human–machine, nature–culture, artifice–intelligence." This begins with a series of texts concerned with mechanical, technological, and biological engineering. It was further developed by a second and third generation of philosophers who have used dispositifs to examine human engineering projects, such as biopower, colonialism, Orientalism, gender, and racialization. The initial iterations of dispositif thinking were concerned with the masculine conception of "Man-the-engineer," but subsequent thinkers adapted this problematic to address the relationship between embodiment and dispositifs in feminist technoscience, queer theory, posthumanism, and transgender theory. It does not matter whether the author emphasizes the discursive dynamics or the material-productive operations of dispositifs, because at its core, dispositif thinking is animated by the problem of engineering.

== Other disciplines ==
=== Linguistics ===
German linguist Siegfried Jäger published several articles on "dispositif analysis" (Dispositivanalyse), which has been influential in German discourse analysis. In an unpublished article, he defines Foucault's dispositif as "the interaction of discursive behavior (i.e. speech and thoughts based upon a shared knowledge pool), non-discursive behavior (i. e. acts based upon knowledge), and manifestations of knowledge by means of acts or behaviors...." He compares dispositifs to Gesamtkunstwerk, due to their complexity, as being interwoven and integrated across societies. See de:Dispositiv.

=== Organizational theory ===
In a working paper, Sverre Raffnsøe et al. demonstrate that Foucault's "dispositive" is not only a key concept in Foucault's research, but also "a resourceful approach to the study of contemporary societal problems." In a separate article, Raffnsøe et al. argue that "the dispositionally prescriptive level is a crucial aspect of social reality in organizational life, since it has a determining effect on what is taken for granted and considered real." It further "determines not only what is and can be considered possible but also what can even be imagined and anticipated as potentially realizable, as something one can hope for, or act to bring about". This organizational approach, they claim, moves beyond the narrow reading of dispositifs in discourse analysis, which reduces "organizations to discursive constructions and organizing to linguistic practices." In contrast, "the dispositive maps a systematism that cuts across and closely connects the discursive and non-discursive."

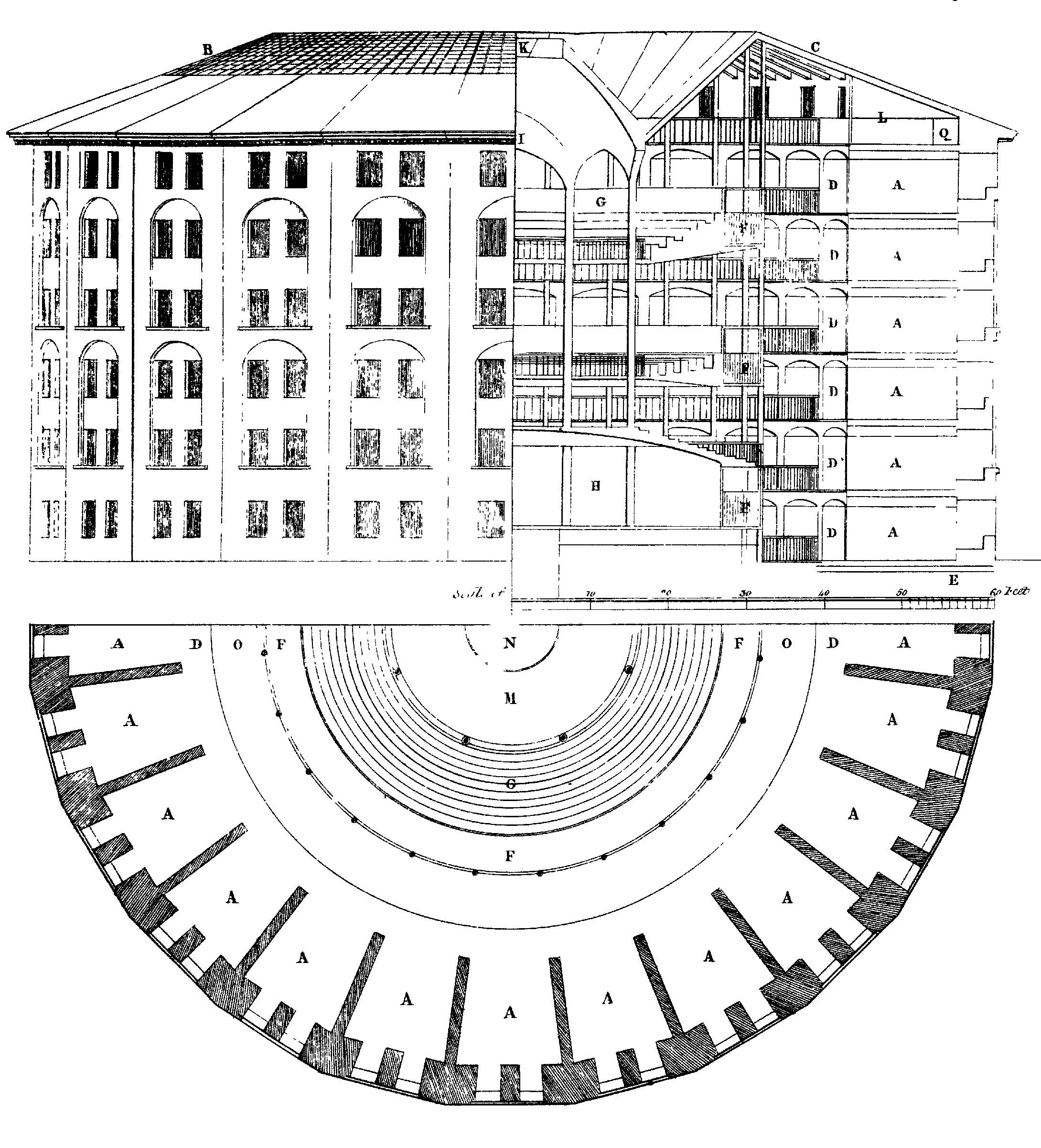
Plan of the Jeremy Bentham's Panopticon Prison (drawn by Willey Reveley in 1791)

=== Geography ===
French geographers have drawn from Foucault's description of the panopticon as a dispositif to conceptualize "spatial dispositifs" (dispositif spatial). Michel Lussault, for example, argues that the spatial dispositif disposes and is disposed. It is much more than a simple object with an effect (map or plans), instead it is "hybrid of materiality (the city) and ideality (values and territorial ideologies." Jean Estebanez has used this concept to examine the spatial design of zoos as a system that make power and norms concrete. Olivier Milhaud has also applied the spatial dispositif to examine how prisons inscribe a geographical punishment on their subjects. See Fr:Dispositif (philosophie).

=== Communication and information science ===
In her book The Dispositif: A Concept for Information and Communication Sciences, Valerie Larroche summarizes Foucault's dispositifs as any of the various institutional, physical, and administrative mechanisms and knowledge structures which enhance and maintain the exercise of power within the social body. The links between these elements are said to be heterogeneous since knowledge, practices, techniques, and institutions are established and reestablished in every age. It is through these links that power relations are structured.

== See also ==
- Apparatus theory
- Assemblage (philosophy)
- Autonomist Marxism
- Biopolitics
- Discourse analysis
- Episteme
- Feminist technoscience
- Foucauldian discourse analysis
- Immaterial labor
- Institution
- Disposition
- Gestell
- Necropolitics
- Parergon
- Philosophy of technology
- Posthumanism
- Post-structuralism
- Psychoanalytic film theory
- Queer theory
- Science and technology studies
