= Royal Netherlands Academy of Arts and Sciences =

Dutch learned society

Royal Netherlands Academy of Arts and Science
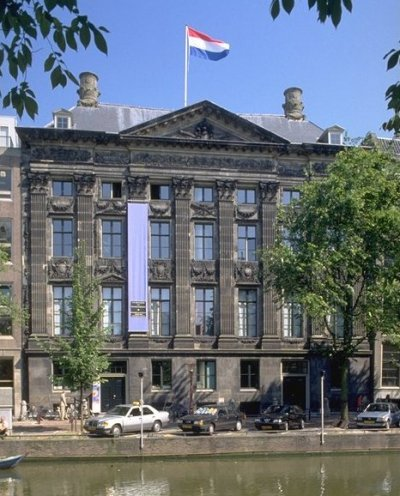
- The Trippenhuis is the seat of the academy.
- Formation: 8 May 1808; 218 years ago
- Headquarters: Trippenhuis
- Location(s): Kloveniersburgwal 29; Amsterdam, Netherlands
- Coordinates: 52°22′17.5″N 4°53′59″E
- President: Peter-Paul Verbeek
- Website: www.knaw.nl
- Formerly called: Royal Institute of Science, Letters and Fine Arts

The Royal Netherlands Academy of Arts and Sciences (Dutch: Koninklijke Nederlandse Akademie van Wetenschappen, abbr. KNAW) is an organization dedicated to the advancement of science and literature in the Netherlands. The academy is housed in the Trippenhuis in Amsterdam.

In addition to various advisory and administrative functions it operates a number of research institutes and awards many prizes, including the Lorentz Medal in theoretical physics, the Dr Hendrik Muller Prize for Behavioural and Social Science and the Heineken Prizes.

== Main functions ==
The academy advises the Dutch government on scientific matters. While its advice often pertains to genuine scientific concerns, it also counsels the government on such topics as policy on careers for researchers or the Netherlands' contribution to major international projects. The academy offers solicited and unsolicited advice to parliament, ministries, universities and research institutes, funding agencies and international organizations.

- Advising the government on matters related to scientific research
- Providing a forum for the scientific world and promoting international scientific cooperation
- Acting as an umbrella organization for the institutes primarily engaged in basic and strategic scientific research and disseminating information

== Members and organization ==
The members are appointed for life by co-optation. Nominations for candidate membership by persons or organizations outside the academy are accepted. The acceptance criterion is delivered scientific achievements. Academy membership is therefore regarded as a great honor, and prestigious. Besides regular members, there are foreign members and corresponding members. Since a new membership system was introduced in 2011 there will be no new corresponding members. Each year a maximum of sixteen members are appointed to the academy.

The Royal Netherlands Academy of Arts and Sciences has long embraced the entire field of learning. The Royal Academy comprises two departments, consisting of around 500 members:

- Science (mathematics, physics, astronomy, life sciences, and engineering sciences)
- Humanities and Social Sciences (humanities, law, behavioural sciences and social sciences)

Both departments have their own board. The departments, in turn, are divided into sections. The highest organ in the academy is the general meeting of members, the united meeting of both departments. The president was Frits van Oostrom until 1 May 2008, after which he was succeeded by Robbert Dijkgraaf. Both van Oostrom in his leaving address and Dijkgraaf in his inaugural address have voiced their worries about the low level of funding in science in the Netherlands compared to almost all other Western countries. A list of presidents of the academy is as follows:

- 1973–1978 Hendrik Casimir
- 1978–1981 Samuel Dresden
- 1981–1984 André Donner
- 1984–1990 David de Wied
- 1990–1996 Pieter Drenth
- 1996–1999 Pieter Zandbergen
- 1999–2002 Robert S. Reneman
- 2002–2005 Willem Levelt
- 2005–2008 Frits van Oostrom
- 2008–2012 Robbert Dijkgraaf
- 2012–2015 Hans Clevers
- 2015–2018 José van Dijck
- 2018–2020 Wim van Saarloos
- 2020–2022 Ineke Sluiter
- 2022–2026 Marileen Dogterom
- 2026–present Peter-Paul Verbeek

== History ==
During the Kingdom of Holland, it was founded as the Koninklijk Instituut van Wetenschappen, Letterkunde en Schoone Kunsten (Royal Institute of Sciences, Literature and Fine Arts) by Lodewijk Napoleon on May 4, 1808. In 1816, after the occupation had ended, it was renamed to Koninklijk-Nederlandsch Instituut van Wetenschappen, Letteren en Schoone Kunsten. In 1851, it was disbanded and re-established as the Koninklijke Akademie van Wetenschappen and in 1938 obtained its present name. Since 1812, the academy has resided in the Trippenhuis in Amsterdam.

The institute was awarded the Gouden Ganzenveer in 1955.

== Research institutes ==
The following research institutes are associated with the KNAW:

- Data Archiving and Networked Services (since 2005)
- Fryske Akademy (since 1990, founded in 1938)
- Hubrecht Institute (research institute for developmental biology and stem cells in the Netherlands) (since 1917)
- Huygens Institute for the History of the Netherlands (since 1992)
- International Institute of Social History (since 1979, founded in 1935)
- Royal Netherlands Institute of Southeast Asian and Caribbean Studies (since 2001, founded in 1851)
- Meertens Instituut (since 1952)
- Netherlands Institute for Neuroscience (NIN) (established in 2005 as a merger of the Netherlands Institute for Brain Research (NIH, established in 1909) and the Netherlands Ophthalmic Research Institute (IOI, established in 1988))
- Netherlands Institute of Ecology (Nederlands Instituut voor Ecologie) (NIOO-KNAW) (since 1992)
- NIOD Institute for War, Holocaust and Genocide Studies (since 1999, founded in 1945)
- Nederlands Instituut voor Wetenschappelijke Informatiediensten (1997–2005)
- Nederlands Interdisciplinair Demografisch Instituut (since 2003)
- Netherlands Institute for Advanced Study in the Humanities and Social Sciences (since 1988)
- Rathenau Instituut (since 1994, previously NOTA (1987-1994))
- Westerdijk Fungal Biodiversity Institute (since 1904)

== Young Academy ==
De Jonge Akademie (The Young Academy) is a society of younger science researchers, founded in 2005 as part of the KNAW. Ten members are elected each year for a term of five years; members are scientists between 25 and 45 years old and are selected for a record of excellence in their research. It was modelled after the similar German Junge Akademie and both of these academies in turn were used as models for the Global Young Academy.

== Society of Arts ==
The Society of Arts (Akademie van Kunsten) is a society of prominent artists from various disciplines, including architecture, visual arts, dance, film, photography, literature, music and performing arts. Its aim is to be the place "for debate about the value of art in society and about the relationship between art and science". The Society of Arts was established by the Royal Netherlands Academy of Arts and Sciences in 2014. Both are seated in the 17th century Trippenhuis in Amsterdam. At the start the Society of Arts had 19 members. Each year the number of members increases with 6 new members who are offered a membership for life. In 2022 the Society of Arts has 76 members. Members of the Society of Arts are elected by nomination. Anyone can nominate leading artists from all disciplines who have distinguished themselves on the basis of demonstrable artistic achievements.

== See also ==
- Dutch Research Council (NWO)
- Koninklijke Hollandsche Maatschappij der Wetenschappen (Royal Holland Society of Sciences and Humanities)
- Netherlands Organisation for Applied Scientific Research (TNO)
