= Don Ihde =

American philosopher (1934–2024)

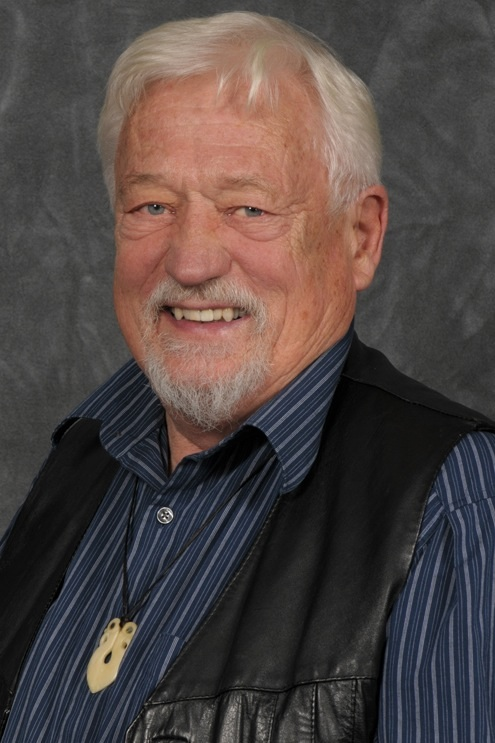
- Born: January 14, 1934; Hope, Kansas, U.S.
- Died: January 17, 2024 (aged 90)

Education
- Education: Boston University (PhD, 1964)
- Thesis: Paul Ricœur's Phenomenological Methodology and Philosophical Anthropology (1964)
- Doctoral advisor: Erazim Kohák

Philosophical work
- Era: Contemporary philosophy
- Region: Western philosophy
- School: Continental philosophy Hermeneutic phenomenology Postphenomenology
- Institutions: Stony Brook University
- Main interests: Philosophy of science, philosophy of technology
- Notable ideas: Experimental phenomenology, instrumental realism

Don Ihde (/ˈaɪdi/; January 14, 1934 – January 17, 2024) was an American philosopher of science and technology. In 1979 he wrote what is often identified as the first North American work on philosophy of technology, Technics and Praxis.

Before his retirement, Ihde was Distinguished Professor of Philosophy at the State University of New York at Stony Brook. In 2013 Ihde received the Golden Eurydice Award.

Ihde was the author of over twenty original books and the editor of many others. He gave numerous lectures and seminars internationally, and some of his books and articles have appeared in a dozen languages.

Ihde died on January 17, 2024, aged 90.

== Major concepts and thought ==
=== Postphenomenology ===
Don Ihde uses the methodological tools of phenomenology and postphenomenology to analyse technology, and specifically the relations between humans and technological artefacts. Rather than thinking about technology as an abstract category, postphenomenological analysis looks at actual artefacts and the way they interact with users. Technologies, according to this view, mediate our relationship to the world, influencing the way we see it, understand it, and act on it. Other important authors in the field of postphenomenology are Peter-Paul Verbeek and Robert Rosenberger.

=== Bodies in cyberspace ===
Ihde's work Bodies in Technology spells out the original exploration of the ways cyberspace affects the human experience. The book explores embodiment in cyberspace with references to human–computer interaction (HCI) research. The main question of the book is the meaning of bodies in technology.

Ihde rejects Cartesian dualism. Even to have an out of body experience is to have an implicit 'here-body' from which we experience an 'object-body' over there. He has further explored these arguments in his book Bodies in Technology.

Beginning with a "phenomenology of multistability" in the way various "technological media" are perceived, Ihde examines the "roles of human embodiment, perception, and spatial transformations within communication and information media."

Ihde argues that movies like the Matrix trilogy play upon fantasy in a technological context and relate to the human sense of embodiment. He stresses an important fact that we have to experience the embodiment where we live, rather than to "plugin" to a technofantasies world.

=== Technoscience ===
The study of technoscience examines recent work in the fields of the philosophies of science and technology, and science studies; it also emphasizes the roles of our material cultures and expertise. According to Ihde, science and technology are in a symbiotic relationship, where scientific research relies fully on the development of scientific instruments, the technological development.

In a paper "Was Heidegger prescient concerning Technoscience?", Ihde re-examines Martin Heidegger's philosophy of science with a reappraisal of what was innovative, and what remained archaic. Heidegger then is read against the background of the "new" approaches to science in science studies, and against the background of the scientific revolutions which have occurred since the mid-20th century.

=== Material and expanding hermeneutics ===
Ihde has introduced the concept of material hermeneutics, which characterises much practice within the domains of technoscience. He rejects the vestigial Diltheyan division between the humanistic and natural sciences and argues that certain types of critical interpretation, broadly hermeneutic, characterize both sets of disciplines. He examines what he calls a style of interpretation based in material practices relating to imaging technologies which have given rise to the visual hermeneutics in technoscience studies.

With references to science studies, sociology of science and feminist critique of science, Ihde has presented the idea of expanding hermeneutics, which emphasises praxis, instruments and laboratories over theoretical work. He claims that in science, the instruments and technologies used operate in a hermeneutic way.

=== Philosophers in research and development ===
Ihde argued on numerous occasions that "if the philosopher is to play a more important role it must not be only in or limited to the Hemingway role. Rather, it should take place in the equivalent of the officers' strategy meeting, before the battle takes shape. I will call this the 'R&D [research and development] role'". Philosophers should engage with interdisciplinary research and actively participate in research and development work. He has claimed that only by having philosophers in R&D can they have truly new and emerging technologies that are philosophically engaged. Philosophers, precisely postphenomenologists, could help the scientific community to think about the future, rather than only about present-day phenomena or the past.

== Selected works ==
=== Books ===
- Sense and Significance (1973)
- Listening and Voice: A phenomenology of sound (1976)
- Experimental Phenomenology: An Introduction (1977)
- Technics and Praxis: A Philosophy of Technology (1979)
- Hermeneutic Phenomenology: The Philosophy of Paul Ricoeur (1980)
- Existential Technics (1983)
- Consequences of Phenomenology (1986)
- Technology and the Lifeworld: From Garden to Earth (1990)
- Instrumental Realism (1991)
- Postphenomenology: essays in the postmodern context (1993)
- Philosophy of Technology: An Introduction (1998)
- Expanding Hermeneutics: Visualism in Science (1999)
- Bodies in Technology (2001)
- Chasing Technoscience (2003)
- Listening and Voice: Phenomenologies of Sound (2nd expanded edition, 2007)
- Ironic Technics (2008)
- Postphenomenology and Technoscience (Chinese 2008, English 2009; also in Spanish, Hebrew and forthcoming Portuguese)
- Embodied Technics (2010)
- Heidegger's Technologies: Postphenomenological Perspectives (2010)
- Expanded 2nd edition, Experimental Phenomenology: Multistabilities (2012)
- Acoustic Technics (2015)
- Husserl's Missing Technologies (2016)
- Medical Technics (2019)

=== Articles ===
- Ihde, D. (1997). Thingly hermeneutics/Technoconstructions in Man and World 30: 369–381, 1997, Kluwer Academic Publishers. Printed in the Netherlands.
- Ihde, D. (2000). Technoscience and the 'other' continental philosophy in Continental Philosophy Review 33: 59–74, Kluwer Academic Publishers. Printed in the Netherlands.
- Ihde, D. (2003). THE ULTIMATE PHENOMENOLOGICAL REDUCTION (pp. 59 – 67) in Interfaces 21/22 http://topologicalmedialab.net/xinwei/classes/readings/Arakawa+Gins/Interfaces-Arakawa_volume21-22-1.pdf
- Ihde, D. (2004). A phenomenology of technics. In D. M. Kaplan (Ed.) Readings in the philosophy of technology (pp. 137–159). Lanham, MD.: Rowman & Littlefield.
- Ihde D. (2004a). Simulation and embodiment In: yearbook of the Institute of Advanced Study on Science, Technology and Society, Profil Verlag, pp 231–244.
- Ihde D. (2006). Technofantasies and embodiment. In: Diocaretz M, Herbrechter S (eds) The matrix in theory, (Rodopi, 2006), pp 153–166.
- Ihde D. (2008). Of which human are we post? In: The global spiral (Publication of Metanexus Institute) vol 9, Issue 3, June 2008.
