= Philosophy & Technology =

- Discipline: Philosophy of technology
- Language: English
- Edited by: Luciano Floridi

Publication details
- History: 1988-present
- Publisher: Springer Science+Business Media
- Frequency: Quarterly
- Open access: Hybrid

Standard abbreviations
- ISO 4: Philos. Technol.

Indexing
- ISSN: 2210-5433 (print); 2210-5441 (web)
- LCCN: 2011208759
- OCLC no.: 725883956

Links
- Journal homepage; Online archive

Philosophy & Technology is a quarterly peer-reviewed academic journal covering philosophy of technology. It is published by Springer Science+Business Media and the editor-in-chief is Luciano Floridi (University of Oxford). Besides regular issues, the journal publishes occasional special issues and topical collections on particular philosophical topics.

== Abstracting and indexing ==
The journal is abstracted and indexed in EBSCO databases, PhilPapers, ProQuest databases, and Scopus.
