= Roberto Esposito =

Italian political philosopher, critical theorist, and professor (born 1950)

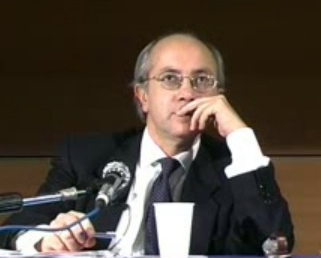
- Esposito in 2000
- Born: August 4, 1950 (age 75); Piano di Sorrento, Italy

Education
- Education: University of Naples Federico II

Philosophical work
- Era: Contemporary philosophy
- Region: Western philosophy
- School: Continental philosophy
- Institutions: Scuola Normale Superiore
- Main interests: Biopolitics, metapolitics, political philosophy
- Notable ideas: Italian thought

Roberto Esposito (born 4 August 1950) is an Italian political philosopher and critical theorist, notable for his contributions to biopolitics, Italian thought, and metapolitics. He currently serves as emeritus professor of theoretical philosophy at the Scuola Normale Superiore in Pisa.

== Biography ==
Esposito was born in Piano di Sorrento, Italy on 4 August 1950. He graduated from the University of Naples Federico II. He was vice director of the Italian Institute of Human Sciences of Naples, full professor of theoretical philosophy, and the coordinator of the Ph.D. program in philosophy until 2013. For five years, he was the only Italian member of the International Council of Scholars of the Collège international de philosophie in Paris.

He was one of the founders of the European Political Lexicon Research Centre and of the International Centre for a European Legal and Political Lexicon, which was established by a consortium made up of the Universities of Bologna, Florence, Padua, Salerno, Naples "L'Orientale", and Naples S. Orsola Benincasa. He is co-editor of the book series Filosofia Politica published by il Mulino, the series Per la Storia della Filosofia Politica published by Franco Angeli, the series Storia e teoria politica published by Bibliopolis, and the series Comunità e Libertà published by Laterza. He is editor of the series Teoria e Oggetti published by Liguori and also acts as a philosophy consultant for the publishing house Einaudi. He has been featured in the Summer 2006 and Fall 2009 issues of the journal Diacritics and the Fall 2013 special issue of the journal Angelaki.

== Thought ==
Esposito's core philosophical insight is that the traditional political lexicon has become exhausted. His multi-decade research focuses on reviving and re-conceptualizing the tradition of political philosophy, starting from the point of reinterpreting classical categories. In English, he is best known for his contributions to biopolitics, rethinking the political, the philosophy of personhood, Italian philosophy, and the study of institutions. His work synthesizes various fields of study and languages, from philosophy to literature, art, poetry, anthropology and theology. After his early studies on the thought of Vico and Machiavelli, his philosophy has followed five thematic studies:

=== The impolitical ===
In the 1980s and 1990s, Esposito engaged in the largely French debate about the waning significance of the political in an increasingly neo-liberal, post-political, even de-politicized era. Inspired by Carl Schmitt's Political Theology (1934, 2004) and The Concept of the Political (1932, 1996), and the deconstructive method of Jacques Derrida, French philosophers such as Jean-Luc Nancy and Philippe Lacoue-Labarthe, argued that modern politics meant that the political was in retreat. In a series of papers and books that draw from Hannah Arendt and Simone Weil, Esposito introduced an alternative term: the "impolitical". The impolitical does not imply an anti-political end, or the death of politics, but rather the outer limit of the political. It is a border from which we might find a path beyond the horizon of political theology, including the politics of representation, transcendentalism, and the depoliticizing narratives found in those arguing that modernity was completed. The impolitical creates an internal tension within the political, where openings emerge for rethinking the political lexicon of the West. This work spanned three books and multiple papers: Categories of the Impolitical (1988, 2015), Nove pensieri sulla politica (1988), and The Origin of the Political: Hannah Arendt or Simone Weil? (1996, 2017).

=== Community, immunity, and biopolitics ===
In the late 1990s and early 2000s, Esposito wrote three books culminating in a trilogy on the meaning and place of community in an increasingly immunized world. Some refer to these books as his "biopolitical trilogy", although the first book on community was more inspired by existentialism and the philosophy of ontology.

Communitas: The Origin and Destiny of Community (1998, 2004) represents Esposito's contribution to the fin de siècle debate about the meaning of community in the West. A series of philosophers questioned whether the closed, exclusionary, and identitarian models of community found in the traditions of communitarianism in Anglo-American philosophy and classical social theory were suitable for our globalized world. Instead of abandoning the desire to belong in a community, each attempt to reconceptualize community in an open and inclusive manner. Jean-Luc Nancy is credited with starting this debate with his book The Inoperative Community (1991), followed by Maurice Blanchot's The Unavowable Community (1988), Giorgio Agamben's The Coming Community (1993), and Roberto Esposito's Communitas (1998). Esposito re-examines classical accounts of the exigency of community in political philosophy (Hobbes, Rousseau, Kant, Heidegger, and Bataille) in order to reconceptualize how belonging-together can be conceived. He draws from the distinction between immunitas and communitas in Roman law. Modern political thought, he argues, is riddled by the problem of immunitas—the exemption from obligations to either the state or a community. Immunized communities are based on private property, self-interest, and regulating borders. Against the tradition which juxtaposes private property with common property, or individual identity with collective identity, Esposito proposes that we return to the munus of communitas.

The munus (duty, obligation, gift) is a form of exchange that draws people together, in a "transitive act of giving", which has nothing to do with the "stability of a possession and even less the acquisitive dynamic of something earned, but loss, subtraction, transfer." The munus creates a duty and obligation that binds us together. It is a shared vulnerability and openness that divides us and brings us together in a form of mutuality. In Containing Community, Greg Bird argues that alongside Nancy and Agamben, Esposito seeks to radically rethink community beyond the trappings of the "dispositif of the proper" which shapes how community has been traditionally conceived in the West.

Immunitas: The Protection and Negation of Life (2002, 2011) represents Esposito's first full exploration of biopolitics. In contrast to communitas, immunized persons are private legal persons who are exempt "from the obligation of the munus, be it personal, fiscal, or civil" Drawing on his previous study of the political-legal implications of immunity on community, Esposito turns his attention to the biomedical relationship between human bodies and the social body in this book. Just as a human body's immune system is designed to protect it from deadly threats, such as viruses, the law is designed to protect people from being exposed to the risk of conflict and life-threatening situations. Life is protected by denying other life. Modern biopolitical societies and politics are increasingly defined by immunization mechanisms (anti-immigration policies, hyper-individualism, protection of private property, etc.). The more defensive a society becomes, with heightened fears of being infected by foreign elements, the more closed off they become. He warns that this self-defence mechanism at the core of biopolitical societies contains an inherently negative, lethal principle, which could potentially lead to a mutation of the immunization mechanisms. Hyper-immunized societies can easily morph into self-destructive autoimmune societies, just as the Nazi regime ended by turning on itself.

Bíos: Biopolitics and Philosophy (2004, 2008) represents a genealogical account of the broad and diverse sources of biopolitical thought—including Michel Foucault, Friedrich Nietzsche, eugenics, Darwinism, scientific racism, and vitalism—from the perspective of the concept of immunity. Since immunitas is a "negative protection of life", biopolitics is always at risk of turning into thanatopolitics. Contrary to the "negative biopolitics" of many interpreters of Foucault, including Giorgio Agamben, who views biopolitical governmentality and biopower as domination and control over life, Esposito argues that we need to re-imagine biopolitics in an "affirmative" manner. For Esposito, communities cannot occur without some form of immunity system; however, the point of an affirmative biopolitics is to find a balance between community and immunity. The immunity dispositif must "be shifted from a defensive barrier against the outside," to remove the militaristic and "aggressive metaphors, or tropes." An affirmative model of biopolitics leads to a new politics of life, not a politics over life — where life's potential can be fostered and alternative forms of existence can flourish. Affirmative biopolitics could give rise to a communitas where life is affirmed against the grain of the negative, thanatopolitical, or necropolitics, regime of immunization.

=== The impersonal ===
In the early 2000s, Esposito wrote a trilogy of books covering the paradigm of the person in modern political thought: Third Person: Politics of Life and Philosophy of the Impersonal (2007, 2012), Two: The Machine of Political Theology and the Place of Thought (2013, 2015), Persons and Things (2014, 2015). Starting from a critique of the Roman legal and Christian theological concept of the person, understood as a dispositif (dispositivo) that separates human life from itself, the impersonal is understood as the form of a possible reunification between biological life and intellectual life, body and person. In Improper Life, Timothy Campbell argues that Esposito deploys the impersonal to break the Heideggerian motif of the proper and improper, which is re-articulated in the biopolitical distinction between improper life (zoê, or bare life) and proper life (bíos, qualified life). "To think the impersonal, but more important, to act impersonally, breaks with the proper and improper—breaks with what is considered ours and what is considered mine." The impersonal then represents an opening for thinking about an affirmative biopolitics and communitas.

=== Italian thought ===
In the diptych consisting of the two volumes Living Thought: The Origins and Relevance of Italian Philosophy (2010, 2012) and A Philosophy for Europe: From the Outside (2016, 2018), Esposito attempts to reconceptualize the prevailing tendencies of Italian philosophy as opposed to French Theory and German Philosophy, which he calls Italian Thought. Across these two books Esposito examines classical figures such as Niccolò Machiavelli, Giordano Bruno, Antonio Gramsci, and Giambattista Vico, which he compares to contemporary Italian philosophers of communism and biopolitics, such as Antonio Negri. Esposito argues that what distinguishes Italian philosophy from other traditions is a focus on history, politics, and life. "Living Thought" characterizes this tradition, which is not directed inward, either through logic or the search for self-consciousness, but rather outward looking towards the world itself. There is an affirmative dimension in this tradition, which in contemporary philosophy points to an affirmative politics of life.

=== Institutions ===
Esposito opens a new metapolitical terrain for his studies of the history of political philosophy in Politics and Negation: For an Affirmative Philosophy (2018, 2019). In this book he traces of genealogy of negation in modern political thought. Against the negative, he argues that an affirmative philosophy must be found which neither negates or represses negation, but rather opens a path for rethinking opposition, difference, and determination. This book also serves as the philosophical primer for the trilogy on institutions that follows it: Instituting Thought: Three Paradigms of Political Ontology (2020, 2021), Institution (2021, 2022), and Vitam Instituere: A Genealogy of the Institution (2023, 2025). In these studies, Esposito explores the place of the negative in the dynamics of politically conceived institutions. Continuing with his theme of affirmative biopolitics, Esposito examines the close relationship between human life and institutions. He argues that the two are not opposed to each other, but that institutions serve a vital need, in the instituting power of life. In the final book, he deploys the concept of "institution vitae" from Roman Law, which he argues can be used to conceive of politics as an institutent force.

== Question of Italian thought ==
The question of whether contemporary Italian political philosophy represents a different political paradigm has been subjected to much debate amongst Italian philosophers. "Radical thought" has been used to describe certain Autonomous Marxism and Operaismo traditions in Italy by such thinkers as Antonio Negri, Michael Hardt, Paolo Virno, and Mario Tronti, and the rich tradition of Italian feminism, represented by such groups as Lotta Feminista (Mariarosa Dalla Costa and Silvia Federici). Antonio Negri reluctantly proposed the "Italian Difference", but only if differentiation emphasizes a form of productive resistance. And Roberto Esposito has suggested "Italian thought", which he characterizes by three distinct categories: life (biopolitics), history, and politics.

In 2014, two significant international conferences were held on the subject in Paris and Naples. Each conference included Roberto Espostio, Antonio Negri, Judith Revel, and a series of Italian and international philosophers working on contemporary Italian philosophy. The first conference, "L'Italian theory existe-t-elle?" ("Does Italian Theory Exist?"), was held at the Centre de Recherches Italiennes at the Université Paris-Nanterre (January 24–25, 2014). A second conference called "Italian Theory: Categorie e problemi della filosofia italiana contemporanea" ("Italian Theory: Categories and Problems of Contemporary Italian Philosophy") was held at the Istituto Italiano di Scienze Umane, Scuola Normale Superiore, in Naples, Italy (May 15–17, 2014). At these conferences, the issue of "Italian thought" was subjected to rigorous debate. Fittingly, each conference produced more questions and a wider range of positions rather than a consensus.

== Bibliography (English translations) ==
Monographs

- Communitas: The Origin and Destiny of Community, trans. Timothy Campbell. Stanford University Press, 2009.
- Bíos: Biopolitics and Philosophy, trans. Timothy Campbell. Minnesota University Press, 2008.
- Immunitas: The Protection and Negation of Life, trans. Zakiya Hanafi. Polity Press, 2011.
- Living Thought: The Origins and Actuality of Italian Philosophy, trans. Zakiya Hanafi. Palo Alto: Stanford University Press, 2012.
- Terms of the Political: Community, Immunity, Biopolitics, trans. Rhiannon Noel Welch, Fordham University Press, 2012.
- Third Person: Politics of Life and Philosophy of the Impersonal, trans. Zakiya Hanafi, Polity Press, 2012.
- Categories of the Impolitical, trans. Connal Parsley. Fordham University Press, New York, 2015.
- Persons and Things: From the Body's Point of View, trans. Zakiya Hanafi. Polity Books, 2015.
- Two: The Machine of Political Theology and the Place of Thought, trans. Zakiya Hanafi. Fordham University Press, 2015.
- The Origin of the Political: Hannah Arendt or Simone Weil, trans. Vincenzo Binetti and Gareth Williams. New York: Fordham University Press, 2017.
- A Philosophy for Europe: From the Outside, trans. Zakiya Hanafi. Polity, 2018.
- Politics and Negation: For an Affirmative Philosophy, trans. Zakiya Hanafi. Polity, 2019.
- Instituting Thought: Three Paradigms of Political Ontology, trans. Mark Epstein. Polity, 2021.
- Institution, trans. Zakiya Hanafi. Polity, 2023.
- Common Immunity: Biopolitics in the Age of the Pandemic, trans. Zakiya Hanafi. Polity, 2023.
- Vitam Instituere: A Genealogy of the Institution, trans. Zakiya Hanafi. Polity, 2025.

Selected essays

- "The Immunization Paradigm," in Special Issue: Bios, Immunity, Life: The Thought of Roberto Esposito, trans./edited by Timothy Campbell, Diacritics – Volume 36, Number 2, Summer 2006, pp. 2–22 The Johns Hopkins University Press.
- Interpreting the 20th Century: Totalitarianism or Biopolitics? Barcelona Metropolis 2008.
- "The Return of Italian Philosophy," trans. by Zakiya Hanafi. In Diacritics 39, 3, 2009, pp. 55–61.
- "Politics and Human Nature," in Bio-economy, Christianity, Human Nature, Special Issue: Angelaki: journal of the theoretical humanities, volume 16, number 3, September 2011, Routledge.
- "The Metapolitical Structure of the West," trans. by Matt Langione, Qui Parle: Critical Humanities and Social Sciences volume 22, Number 3, 2012, pp. 147–161.
- "The Dispositif of the Person," in Law, Culture and the Humanities volume 8, number 1, 2012, pp. 17–30.
- "Community, Immunity, Biopolitics", in Greg Bird and Jon Short (eds.), Roberto Esposito, Community, and the Proper, Special Issue: Angelaki, Volume 18, Number 3, 2013, pp. 83–90.
- "Unfinished Italy," in Italian Studies, Volume 76, Number 2, 2021, pp. 128–34.
- "Postdemocracy and Biopolitics," in European Journal of Social Theory, 22(3), 2019, pp. 317–324.
- "Instituting Thought: Three Paradigms of Political Ontology." Cultural Critique, vol. 115, 2022, p. 75-92.
