= The Question Concerning Technology =

1954 non-fiction book by Martin Heidegger

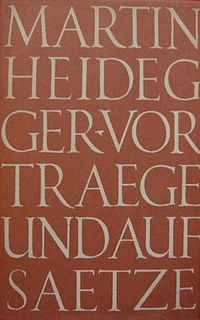
- Cover of Vorträge und Aufsätze
- Author: Martin Heidegger
- Original title: Die Frage nach der Technik
- Translator: William Lovitt
- Language: German
- Subjects: Phenomenology, philosophy of technology
- Publisher: Garland Publishing
- Publication date: 1954
- Publication place: Germany
- English publication date: 1977
- Preceded by: Hölderlin's Hymn "The Ister"
- Followed by: The Origin of the Work of Art

"The Question Concerning Technology" (German: Die Frage nach der Technik) is a 1954 work by Martin Heidegger, in which the author discusses the essence of technology.

Heidegger initially developed the themes of the essay in his lecture "Enframing" ("Das Gestell"), first delivered on 1 December 1949 in Bremen. The lecture was the second of four collectively titled "Insight into What Is" ("Einblick in das, was ist"), alongside "The Thing" ("Das Ding"), "The Danger" ("Die Gefahr"), and "The Turning" (Die Kehre).

A substantially revised and expanded version, titled "The Question Concerning Technology" ("Die Frage nach der Technik"), was delivered on 18 November 1953 in Munich and first published in 1954 in Vorträge und Aufsätze. The work was published separately as a pamphlet in 1962.

== Summary ==
The question concerning technology is asked, as Heidegger notes, "so as to prepare a free relationship to it." The relationship will be free "if it opens our human existence (Dasein) to the essence of technology." This is because "[o]nly the true brings us into a free relationship with that which concerns us from out of its essence." Thus, questioning uncovers the questioned in its (true) essence as it is, enabling it to be "experienced within its own bounds" by seeking "the true by way of the correct." This is akin to the Aristotelian way of advancing "from what is more obscure by nature, but clearer to us, towards what is more clear and more knowable by nature."

Heidegger begins the question by noting that "We ask the question concerning technology when we ask what it is." This stems from following an ancient doctrine to which "the essence of a thing is considered to be what the thing is." He starts from the correct or clear definition that "Everyone knows the two statements that answer our question," that is, that "[t]echnology is a means to an end [and] a human activity." The reason granted is that "to posit ends and procure and utilize the means to them is a human activity." If technology is a means to a human end, this conception can therefore be "called the instrumental and anthropological definition of technology." This raises the further question, "[w]hat is the instrumental itself?" This entails questioning the purview of instrumentality in which means and ends are subsumed, entailing the question, "[w]ithin what do such things as means and end belong?"

A means can be seen as that through and by which an end is effected. It is that "whereby something is effected and thus attained." In essence, it can be seen as a cause, for "Whatever has an effect as its consequence is called a cause." But an end is also a cause to the extent that it determines the kind of means to be used to actualize it. As noted, "The end in keeping with which the kind of means to be used is determined is also considered a cause." This conceptualization of instrumentality as means and ends leads the question further into causality, suggesting that "[w]herever ends are pursued and means are employed, wherever instrumentality reigns, there reigns causality."

To question causality, Heidegger starts from what "[f]or centuries philosophy has taught" regarding the traditional "four causes." These are traditionally enumerated as (1) the "causa materialis, the material, the matter out of which" something is made; (2) the "causa formalis, the form, the shape into which the material enters"; (3) the "causa finalis, the end, in relation to which [the thing] required is determined as to its form and matter"; and (4) the "causa efficiens, which brings about the effect that is the finished [thing]." Heidegger concludes that "[w]hat technology is, when represented as a means, discloses itself when we trace instrumentality back to fourfold causality." To explain this, Heidegger uses the example of a silver chalice. Each element works together to create the chalice in a different manner:

Thus four ways of owing hold sway in the sacrificial vessel that lies ready before us. They differ from one another, yet they belong together. ... The four ways of being responsible bring something into appearance. They let it come forth into presencing. They set it free to that place and so start it on its way, namely into its complete arrival.

When these four elements work together to create something into appearance, it is called bringing-forth. This bringing-forth comes from the Greek poiesis, which "brings out of concealment into unconcealment." This revealing can be represented by the Greek word aletheia, which in English is translated as "truth." This truth has everything to do with the essence of technology because technology is a means of revealing the truth.

Modern technology, however, differs from poiesis. Heidegger suggests that this difference stems from the fact that modern technology "is based on modern physics as an exact science." The revealing of modern technology, therefore, is not bringing-forth, but rather challenging-forth. To exemplify this, Heidegger draws on the Rhine River as an example of how our modern technology can change a cultural symbol.

To further his discussion of modern technology, Heidegger introduces the notion of standing-reserve. Modern technology places humans in standing-reserve. To explain this, Heidegger uses the example of a forester and his relationship to the paper and print industries, as he waits in standing reserve for their wishes.

Heidegger once again returns to discuss the essence of modern technology to name it Gestell. The original German meaning something more like scaffolding, he defines it primarily as a sort of enframing:

Enframing means the gathering together of that setting-upon that sets upon man, i.e., challenges him forth, to reveal the real, in the mode of ordering, as standing-reserve. Enframing means that way of revealing that holds sway in the essence of modern technology and that it is itself not technological.

Once he has discussed enframing, Heidegger highlights the threat of technology. As he states, this threat "does not come in the first instance from the potentially lethal machines and apparatus of technology." Rather, the threat is the essence because "the rule of enframing threatens man with the possibility that it could be denied to him to enter into a more original revealing and hence to experience the call of a more primal truth." This is because challenging-forth conceals the process of bringing-forth, which means that truth itself is concealed and no longer unrevealed. Unless humanity makes an effort to re-orient itself, it will not be able to find revealing and truth.

It is at this point that Heidegger has encountered a paradox: humanity must be able to navigate the dangerous orientation of enframing because it is in this dangerous orientation that we find the potential to be rescued. To further elaborate on this, Heidegger returns to his discussion of essence. Ultimately, he concludes that "the essence of technology is in a lofty sense ambiguous" and that "such ambiguity points to the mystery of all revealing, i.e., of truth."

The question concerning technology, Heidegger concludes, is one "concerning the constellation in which revealing and concealing, in which the coming to presence of the truth comes to pass." In other words, it is finding truth. Heidegger presents art as a way to navigate this constellation, this paradox, because the artist, or the poet as Heidegger suggests, views the world as it is and as it reveals itself.

== See also ==
- Criticism of technology
- Dispositif
- Jacques Ellul
- Gestell
- The Technological Society (1954/64)
- Man and Technics (1931)
- Philosophy of technology
- Propaganda: The Formation of Men's Attitudes
