= David Strong =

American philosopher and educator

David Strong is an American philosopher and educator. He is a Professor of Philosophy and Environmental Studies at Rocky Mountain College. Strong has been noted as a disciple of Albert Borgmann; Strong explores Borgmann's ideas on technology within the context of a philosophy of wilderness in his book, Crazy Mountains.

== Education ==
Strong received his B.A. degree in philosophy from the University of Montana, and his PhD degree in philosophy from the State University of New York at Stony Brook.

== Books ==
- ——— (1995). Crazy Mountains: learning from wilderness to weigh technology. Albany, NY: State Univ. of New York Press. ISBN 0791426521.
- Higgs, Eric; Light, Andrew; ———, eds. (2000). Technology and the good life?. Chicago, Ill.: University of Chicago Press. ISBN 9780226333878.

== See also ==
- American philosophy
- List of American philosophers
