= Eric Higgs (environmental scholar) =

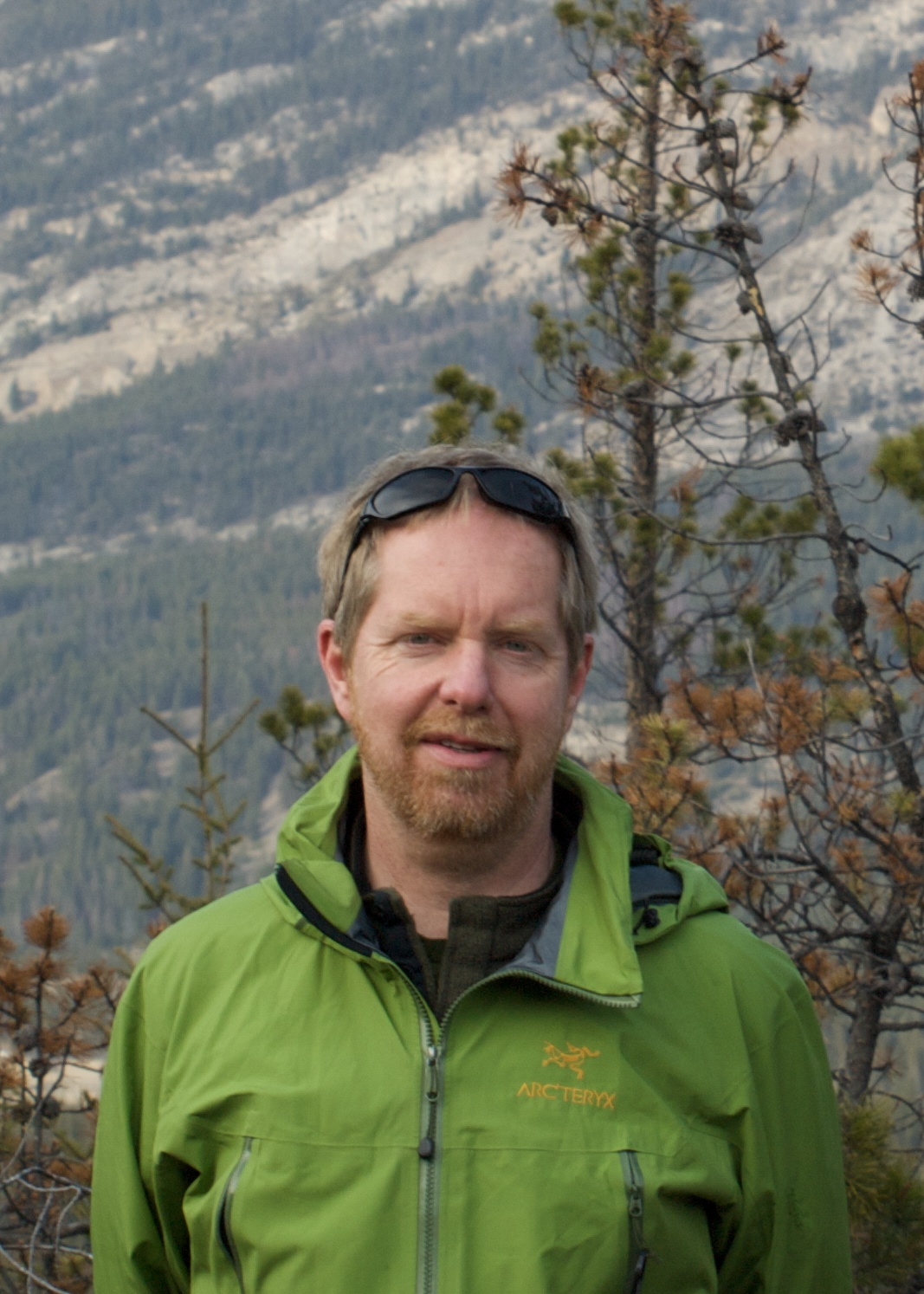
- Born: Eric Stowe Higgs; February 7, 1958 (age 68); Brantford, Ontario, Canada
- Education: University of Waterloo
- Occupation: professor
- Known for: Nature by Design (2003)
- Website: erichiggs.ca

Eric Stowe Higgs (born February 7, 1958) is a Canadian ecologist. He is a professor in the School of Environmental Studies at the University of Victoria. Trained in ecology, philosophy, and environmental planning, his work concerns ecological restoration, historical ecology, intervention ecology, and the changing character of life in technological society. He also works with the Mountain Legacy Project as the Principal Instigator.

== Early life and training ==
Eric Higgs was born in Brantford, Ontario, to David P.J. Higgs and Barbara Isabel Stowe. His pre-school years were in North Delta, British Columbia (near Vancouver). He attended public school in Thornhill, Ontario (near Toronto), and secondary school (Brantford Collegiate and Pauline Johnston Secondary School) in Brantford. In 1976, he turned away from what had been a strong early passion for physics and engineering, and attend the Integrated Studies Program at the University of Waterloo. The Integrated Studies Program was student-driven and required self-motivation to complete an open curriculum in a subjects of the student's choosing. He completed an undergraduate thesis, "A theory for the interaction of ecology and the social order," that blended history of ecology with social philosophy and environmental ethics. Immediately upon graduation with a Bachelor of Independent Studies (B.I.S.) in 1979, he took up an internship at the Hastings Centre (Institute for the Study of Ethics, Society and the Life Sciences) in Hastings-on-Hudson, New York, where he undertook a project on environmental and ecological ethics. He completed a master's degree in philosophy of science at the University of Western Ontario (1980–81), and at the same time undertook ecological consulting work in Southern Ontario. He returned to the University of Waterloo to a new interdisciplinary doctoral program, in which he combined studies in the Department of Philosophy and the School of Urban and Regional Planning. Working with co-supervisors, Lawrence Haworth, a social and moral philosopher, and Robert Dorney, an ecologist and environmental planner, Higgs completed his dissertation, "Planning, Technology and Community Autonomy," in 1988.

== Career ==
His first appointment was in the Department of Environment and Resource Studies at the University of Waterloo (1987–88). He moved to New York City in 1988 to continue research in philosophy of technology in the Philosophy and Technology Studies Center at the Polytechnic University of New York. Higgs' taught at Oberlin College as a visiting assistant professor in the Environmental Studies Program in 1989-90, before taking a tenure-stream position in the new Science, Technology and Society Program at the University of Alberta. The demise of this program led to a formal appointment initially in the Department of Philosophy (1990–92), and later a joint appointment in the Departments of Anthropology and Sociology. He was awarded tenure and promoted to associate professor in 1995.

In 2002, he became director (2002-2010) and associate professor in the School of Environmental Studies at the University of Victoria, and promoted to full professor in 2005.

Higgs has held shorter appointments in Science, Technology and Society (1995), the Maurice Young Centre for Applied Ethics at the University of British Columbia (1996), the School of Environmental Studies at the University of Victoria (2000). He was a professor-at-large in the Institute for Advanced Studies at the University of Western Australia (2012-2014).

In addition to work as a professor, he is the Principal Instigator for the Mountain Legacy Project, a field based group studying long term landscape change in the Canadian mountains using repeat photography techniques.

== Professional activities ==
Eric Higgs was chair of the Society for Ecological Restoration International (now Society for Ecological Restoration ser.org). He served previously as secretary to the board from 1995-2001.

== Writings ==
In 2000, he co-edited (with Andrew Light and David Strong) a volume of essays discussing the work of Albert Borgmann which was described by Paul Durbin as one of the first volumes that explicitly strives to establish the philosophy of technology as an academic subdiscipline with canonical texts .

Higgs' major conceptual contribution to understanding ecological restoration is his 2003 book, Nature By Design: People, Natural Process, and Ecological Restoration (MIT Press).

== Books ==
- Higgs, Eric, Andrew Light and David Strong, Technology and the Good Life? University of Chicago Press, 2000. ISBN 0-226-33387-6. A collection of essays discussing the work of Albert Borgmann.
- Higgs, Eric. Nature by Design: People, Natural Process, and Ecological Restoration. MIT Press, 2003. ISBN 0-262-58226-0
- Ian MacLaren, with Eric Higgs and Gabrielle Zezulka-Maillous. Mapper of Mountains: M.P Bridgland in the Canadian Rockies, 1902-1930. University of Alberta Press, 2005.
- Eric Higgs (forward), Dean Apostol, and Marcia Sinclair, Restoring the Pacific Northwest: The Art and Science of Ecological Restoration in Cascadia by (Island Press - Jun 2006)
- Richard Hobbs, Eric Higgs and Carol Hall (eds.). Novel Ecosystems: Intervening in the New Ecological World Order. Wiley, 2013.
