= Philosophy of technology =

Studies of the nature of technology

The philosophy of technology is a reflective inquiry into the assumptions, values, knowledge claims, and consequences embedded in human making and doing, especially when people design, use, and organize tools, systems, and processes. It examines what technology is (beyond mere tools), how technological artifacts are designed and used, and how technology differs from science and craft. The philosophy of technology deals with ethical, social, and political problems--major questions include whether technology is value-neutral; how responsibility for technological risks should be assigned; and how technologies shape human behavior, culture, power relations, and conceptions of knowledge and agency.

In the West, philosophical discussion of technology (or its Greek ancestor techne) dates back to ancient Greek philosophy. In premodern times, Chinese technology was not primarily organized around Greek techne or Promethean mastery over nature. Instead, it was embedded in relations between dao, qi, li, morality, heaven, and cosmic harmony. Chinese technical practices were therefore not simply “technology” in the modern Western sense, but part of a broader moral-cosmological order.

== History ==
=== Western philosophy ===
==== Ancient Greek philosophy ====
The western term 'technology' comes from the Greek term techne (τέχνη) (art, or craft knowledge) and philosophical views on technology can be traced to the very roots of Western philosophy. A common theme in the Greek view of techne is that it arises as an imitation of nature (for example, weaving developed out of watching spiders). Greek philosophers such as Heraclitus and Democritus endorsed this view. In his Physics, Aristotle agreed that this imitation was often the case, but also argued that techne can go beyond nature and complete "what nature cannot bring to a finish." Aristotle also argued that nature (physis) and techne are ontologically distinct because natural things have an inner principle of generation and motion, as well as an inner teleological final cause, while techne is shaped by an outside cause and an outside telos (goal or end) which shapes it. Natural things strive for some end and reproduce themselves, while techne does not. In Plato's Timaeus, the world is depicted as being the work of a divine craftsman (Demiurge) who created the world in accordance with eternal forms as an artisan makes things using blueprints. Moreover, Plato argues in the Laws, that what a craftsman does is imitate this divine craftsman.

==== Middle ages to 19th century ====
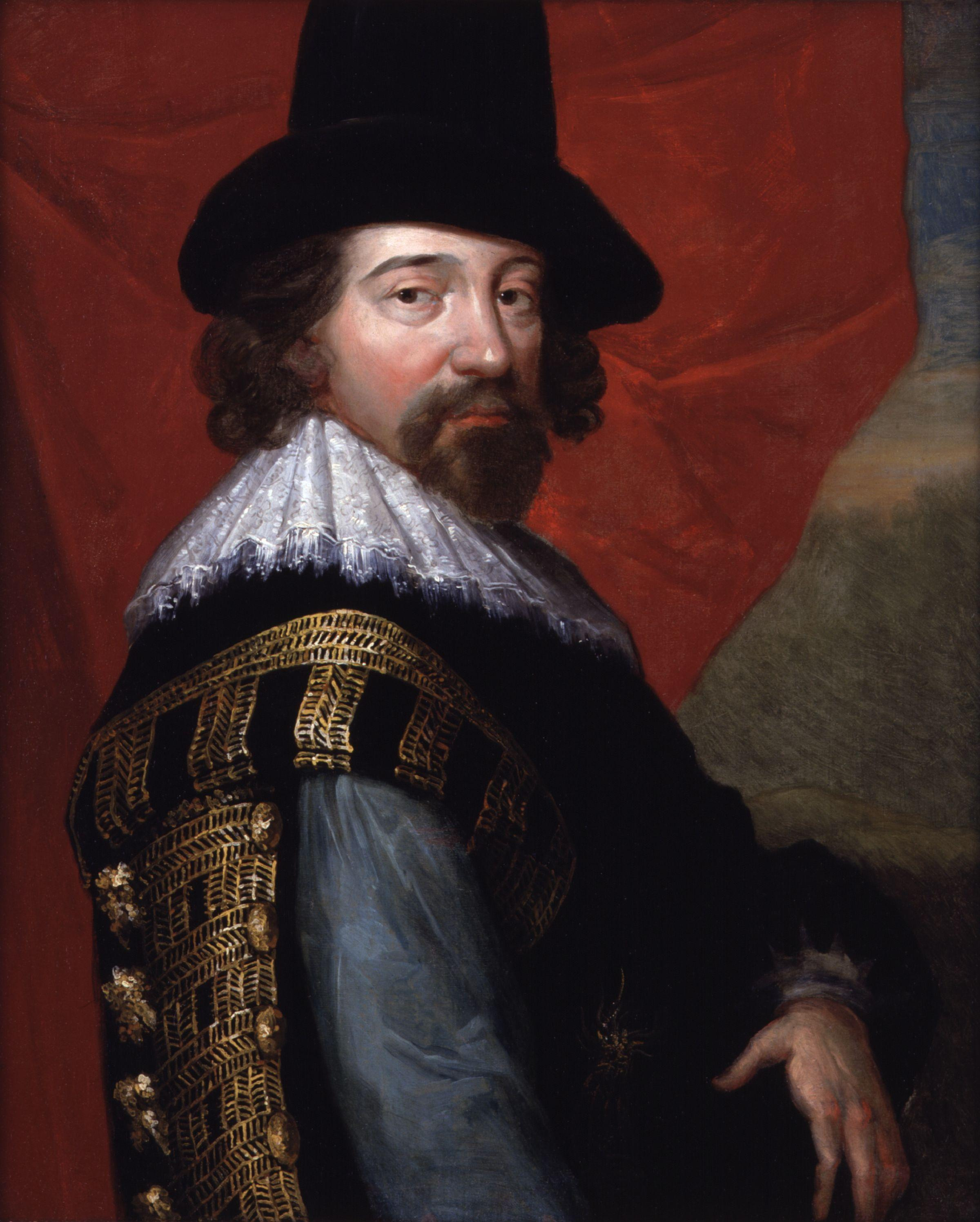
Sir Francis Bacon

During the period of the Roman empire and late antiquity authors produced practical works such as Vitruvius' De Architectura (1st century BC) and Agricola's De Re Metallica (1556). Medieval Scholastic philosophy generally upheld the traditional view of technology as imitation of nature. During the Renaissance, Francis Bacon became one of the first modern authors to reflect on the impact of technology on society. In his utopian work New Atlantis (1627), Bacon put forth an optimistic worldview in which a fictional institution (Salomon's House) uses natural philosophy and technology to extend man's power over nature – for the betterment of society, through works which improve living conditions. The goal of this fictional foundation is "...the knowledge of causes, and secret motions of things; and the enlarging of the bounds of human empire, to the effecting of all things possible".

==== 19th century ====
The phrase "philosophy of technology" was first used in the late 19th century by the German philosopher and geographer Ernst Kapp, who published the foundational work Grundlinien einer Philosophie der Technik (“Elements of a Philosophy of Technology”) in 1877. Kapp, a German émigré who was later based in Texas, was deeply influenced by the philosophy of Hegel and understood technology as a projection or extension of human organs and capacities. For this reason, he is widely regarded as one of the founders of the philosophy of technology in the European tradition. Another influential and more materialist approach to technology later emerged through the writings of thinkers such as Benjamin Franklin and Karl Marx, whose analyses of labor, industry, production, and machinery became central to twentieth-century debates on technology and society.

==== 20th century to present ====
Five early and prominent 20th-century philosophers to directly address the effects of modern technology on humanity include John Dewey, Martin Heidegger, Herbert Marcuse, Günther Anders and Hannah Arendt. They all saw technology as central to modern life, although Heidegger, Anders, Arendt and Marcuse were more ambivalent and critical than Dewey. The problem for Heidegger was the hidden nature of technology's essence, Gestell or Enframing which posed for humans what he called its greatest danger and thus its greatest possibility. Heidegger's major work on technology is found in The Question Concerning Technology. His theory of the Gestell is influential in dispositif thinking.

Technological determinists such as Jaques Ellul have argued that modern technology constitutes a unified monolithic and deterministic force, and that the notion of technology being simply a tool is a serious error. Ellul views the modern technological world-system as being motivated by the needs of its own efficiency and power, not the welfare of the human race or the integrity of the biosphere.

While a number of important individual works were published in the second half of the twentieth century, Paul Durbin has identified two books published at the turn of the century as marking the development of the philosophy of technology as an academic subdiscipline with canonical texts. Those were Technology and the Good Life (2000), edited by Eric Higgs, Andrew Light, and David Strong and American Philosophy of Technology (2001) by Hans Achterhuis. Several collected volumes with topics in philosophy of technology have come out over the past decade. Journals include: Techne: Research in Philosophy and Technology (the journal of the Society for Philosophy and Technology, published by the Philosophy Documentation Center) and Philosophy & Technology (Springer) publish exclusively works in philosophy of technology. Philosophers of technology reflect broadly and work in the area and include interest on diverse topics of geoengineering, internet data and privacy, our understandings of internet cats, technological function and epistemology of technology, computer ethics, biotechnology and its implications, transcendence in space, and technological ethics more broadly.

Bernard Stiegler argued in his Technics and Time, as well as in his other works, that the question of technology has been repressed (in the sense of Freud) by the history of philosophy. Instead, Stiegler showed how the question of technology constitutes the fundamental question of philosophy. Stiegler shows, for example in Plato's Meno, that technology is that which makes anamnesis, namely the access to truth, possible. Stiegler's deconstruction of the history of philosophy through technology as the supplement opens a different path to understand the place of technology in philosophy than the established field of philosophy of technology. In the same vein, philosophers – such as Alexander Galloway, Eugene Thacker, and McKenzie Wark in their book Excommunication – argue that advances in and the pervasiveness of digital technologies transform the philosophy of technology into a new 'first philosophy'. Citing examples such as the analysis of writing and speech in Plato's dialogue The Phaedrus, Galloway et al. suggest that instead of considering technology as a secondary to ontology, technology be understood as prior to the very possibility of philosophy: "Does everything that exists, exist to me presented and represented, to be mediated and remediated, to be communicated and translated? There are mediative situations in which heresy, exile, or banishment carry the day, not repetition, communion, or integration. There are certain kinds of messages that state 'there will be no more messages'. Hence for every communication there is a correlative excommunication."

There has been additional reflection focusing on the philosophy of engineering, as a sub-field within philosophy of technology. Ibo van de Poel and David E. Goldberg edited a volume, Philosophy and Engineering: An Emerging Agenda (2010) which contains a number of research articles focused on design, epistemology, ontology and ethics in engineering.

==== Technology and neutrality ====
Technological determinism is the idea that "features of technology [determine] its use and the role of a progressive society was to adapt to [and benefit from] technological change." The alternative perspective would be social determinism which looks upon society being at fault for the "development and deployment" of technologies. Lelia Green used recent gun massacres such as the Port Arthur Massacre and the Dunblane Massacre to selectively show technological determinism and social determinism. According to Green, a technology can be thought of as a neutral entity only when the sociocultural context and issues circulating the specific technology are removed. It will be then visible to us that there lies a relationship of social groups and power provided through the possession of technologies. A compatibilist position between these two positions is the interactional stance on technology proposed by Batya Friedman that states that social forces and technology co-construct and co-vary with one another.

=== Chinese philosophy ===
Historically, Chinese thought integrated technics with ethics, cosmology, and political order rather than separating them into distinct domains.

Several classical Chinese texts can be interpreted as early forms of philosophy of technology, reflecting on the relation between technics, cosmology, morality, and human action rather than treating tools as merely instrumental. Daoist texts such as the Daodejing and the Zhuangzi discuss concepts such as ziran (self-so) and wu wei (non-coercive action), presenting technical skill as an attunement to the dao rather than domination over nature. The story of Cook Ding carving the ox in the Zhuangzi can be treated as examples of Chinese philosophy of technology, where technical mastery emerges through harmony with the patterns of the world rather than external control. Similarly, Confucian texts such as the Analects and the Mencius understand li (ritual propriety) as a cultivated practice through which human beings harmonize themselves with moral and cosmic order.

Other important texts include the Mozi, which reflects on utility, engineering, measurement, and social organization; the Huainanzi, which synthesizes cosmology, governance, and technical thought; and the Kaogong Ji, an early text on craftsmanship, architecture, and state production. During the Ming dynasty, encyclopedia Tiangong Kaiwu served as an important expression of Chinese philosophy of technology, situating technical production within relations between qi, dao, and natural transformation.

== See also ==
- Dispositif
- Pharmakon
