= Albert Borgmann =

German-American philosopher (1937–2023)

Albert Borgmann (November 23, 1937 – May 7, 2023) was a German-born American philosopher specializing in the philosophy of technology and contemporary culture. He is best known for developing the concept of the device paradigm.

== Life ==
Borgmann was born in Freiburg, and briefly taught German literature at the University of Illinois Urbana-Champaign, and philosophy at DePaul University and then the University of Hawaii before settling in a permanent position as professor of philosophy at the University of Montana. In 2013 Borgmann received the Golden Eurydice Award for his contributions to philosophy. Borgmann died in Missoula, Montana on May 7, 2023, at the age of 85.

== Philosophy ==
Technology and the Character of Contemporary Life: A Philosophical Inquiry (1984) is a landmark text in the philosophy of technology. Borgmann claims that technological devices are not value-neutral and counsels us to discover the good life in a technological world through what he calls "focal things and practices," which engage us in their own right.

Crossing the Postmodern Divide (1992) is a philosophical critique of contemporary culture that offers a powerful alternative vision for the postmodern era. Described as a "[r]ather astoundingly large-minded vision of the nature of humanity, civilization, and science," this book charts a path out of the joyless and artificial culture of consumption.

In Real American Ethics (2006), distancing himself from both conservative and liberal ideology, Borgmann explores the making of American values and proposes new ways for ordinary citizens to improve the country through individual and social choices and actions. Bill McKibben writes that Borgmann's "understanding that consumerism is the great enemy of reality in our time is profound, nonideological, and deeply helpful to any readers concerned not only about their country, but about their own lives."

== Bibliography ==
=== Books ===
- Philosophy of Language: Historical Foundations and Contemporary Issues (1977) ISBN 90-247-1589-X
- Technology and the Character of Contemporary Life: A Philosophical Inquiry (University of Chicago Press 1984) ISBN 0-226-06629-0
- Crossing the Postmodern Divide (University of Chicago Press 1992) ISBN 0-226-06627-4
- Holding onto Reality: The Nature of Information at the Turn of the Millennium (University of Chicago Press 1999) ISBN 0-226-06623-1. See the introduction to the book.
- Power Failure: Christianity in the Culture of Technology (Baker Publishing Group 2003) ISBN 1-58743-058-4
- Real American Ethics: Taking Responsibility for Our Country (University of Chicago Press 2006) ISBN 0-226-06634-7. See an excerpt from the book.
- Moral Cosmology: On Being in the World Fully and Well (2023) ISBN 978-1-66690-046-0

=== Essays ===
- "The Question of Heidegger and Technology: A Critical Review of the Literature," (with the assistance of Carl Mitcham), Philosophy Today 23 (1987): 97-194.
- Chapter by Borgmann in Buchanan, Richard and Victor Margolin, editors Discovering Design: Explorations in Design Studies. University of Chicago Press (1995) ISBN 0-226-07815-9
- Kinds of Pragmatism (Fall 2003)

== See also ==
- American philosophy
