= Technological somnambulism =

Technological somnambulism is a concept used when talking about the philosophy of technology. The term was used by Langdon Winner in his essay Technology as forms of life. Winner puts forth the idea that we are simply in a state of sleepwalking in our mediations with technology. This sleepwalking is caused by a number of factors. One of the primary causes is the way we view technology as tools, something that can be put down and picked up again. Because of this view of objects as something we can easily separate ourselves from, we fail to look at the long term implications of using that object. A second factor is the separation of those who make the technology and those who use the technology. This division causes there to be little thought and research going into the effects of using/developing that technology. The third and most important idea is the way in which technology seems to create new worlds in which we live. These worlds are created by the restructuring of the common and seemingly everyday things around us. In most situations the changes take place with little attention or care from us because we are more focused on the menial aspects of the technology (Winner 105–107).

The concept can be found in the earlier work of Marshall McLuhan, cf. Understanding Media, where he refers to a comment made by David Sarnoff expressing a socially deterministic view of "value free" technology whose value is solely defined by its usage as representing, "...the voice of the current somnambulism". Given that this piece by McLuhan has become standard reading in Media Theory it is reasonable to suspect that Winner encountered the concept there or elsewhere and then went on to develop it further.

== See also ==
- Compatibilism and incompatibilism
- Daniel Chandler's inevitability thesis
- Democratic rationalization
- Philosophy of technology
- Privileged positions of business and science
- Science, technology and society
- Social construction of technology
- Social determinism
- Social shaping of technology
- Sociocultural evolution
- Technological determinism
- Technological fix
