= Alexandru Claudian =

Romanian sociologist, political figure and poet

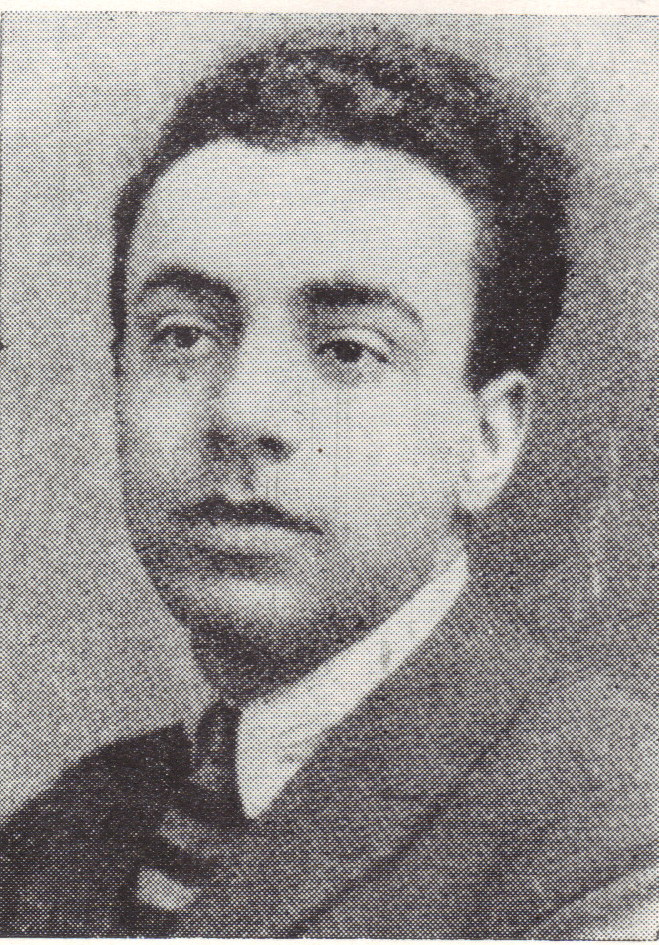
Alexandru Claudian (photo published in 1985)

Alexandru Claudian (also rendered as Al. Claudian; April 8, 1898 – October 16, 1962) was a Romanian sociologist, political figure, and poet. A student and practitioner of Marxism, he worked as a schoolteacher, entry-level academic, field researcher, and journalist, before finally earning a professorship at the University of Iași. An anti-fascist, Claudian enlisted with the Romanian Social Democratic Party during the interwar, moving closer to the anti-communist center by the late 1940s, and became that faction's main theoretician. His condemnation of Marxism and totalitarianism made him an enemy of the communist regime, which imprisoned him for several years and kept him under surveillance until the time of his death.

Claudian's work in the sociology of culture and the history of ideas worked on the assumption of social determinism, discussing the social triggers behind Platonism or Positivism. His contribution was well received by the scientific community, but his isolation form other sociological schools, and his overall discreetness, led to his passing into relative oblivion. Disconnected from his scholarly pursuits, Claudian's poetry is generally of an introspective kind, lyricizing the writer's nostalgia.

== Biography ==
=== Early life ===
Born in Cernavodă, his parents were Floru Claudian, a general in the Romanian Army who came from a working-class family, and his wife Eufimia (née Cernătescu), whose ancestors were Oltenian boyars and participants in the Wallachian Revolution of 1848. Eufimia's uncle, Petru Cernătescu, was an academic and well-to-do landowner. Alexandru's brother Ion trained as a physician, and later earned his reputation as a nutritionist and food historian. A paternal uncle, who was also an Army officer, was the natural father of Alexandru Christian Tell, the poet and political activist.

The family moved around the country as General Claudian was assigned to various posts. Alexandru was enlisted at high schools in Caracal, Buzău, and finally the capital Bucharest, originally matriculating at Mihai Viteazul. In 1918, he graduated, a student at the Saint Sava National College. Taking his diploma from the University of Bucharest's literature and philosophy faculty in 1922, he met there and fell in love with a female colleague, Zoe D. Solomonescu. A Bucharester, she also came from a lower-class background, and the elder Claudians initially objected to their seeing each other romantically. They were nevertheless married in March 1923.

Claudian's literary debut involved poems published in Henric Sanielevici's Curentul Nou magazine in 1920. Going forward, some of his verses were signed with the pen name Anton Costin, particularly those published in Jurnalul Literar. Other magazines for which he wrote include Facla Literară, Viața Literară, Viața Românească, Minerva, Pasul Vremii, Revista de Filosofie, Revista Română, and Iașul Literar.

Initially, Claudian worked as a teacher of French at Bucharest schools, moving to Iași in 1922 to take up a position at the Military High School. He had a stint at Dimitrie Gusti's Social Institute, of which he was secretary (1928–1929), and took part with wife Zoe in Gusti's "monographic" campaign of rural sociology, at Fundu Moldovei. Starting in 1928, at his alma mater, Claudian held seminars on the history of doctrines, but left after a year. In 1929, he also took part in the structured debates which sought to inventory, organize, and correlate field data obtained by Gusti and his teams.

=== University of Iași ===
Claudian began teaching at the University of Iași in late 1929, initially offering courses on ancient philosophy within the literature and philosophy department. He and Zoe occupied a temporary home at Păcurari; she had to commute to Târgu Frumos, where she also worked as a schoolteacher. The couple separated in short while, with Claudian pursuing other women. Never divorcing her "first and one true love" or renouncing her marriage name, Zoe remained his confidant and secretary until the time of his death.

Claudian earned a doctorate at Iași in 1930; his thesis dealt with the agrarian problem in pre-1917 Russia and the role of Marxism in the social transformations undergone by Russia and Germany in 1917–1918. A fragment of the work, detailing the serf emancipation, the miry, and the ideological push for collectivization, was published in 1931 by Viața Românească. According to sociologist Victor Godeanu, it was already obsolete: although Claudian's work was formally "perfect", his most recent references were dated 1925, missing out on the "continuous social transformation in Soviet Russia".

These were the years of his collaboration with the two leading figures of Iași's sociological circles: Ștefan Zeletin and Petre Andrei—Claudian served as their assistant, successively. In 1937–1938 he was in Paris on a scholarship from the French government; while there, he worked with Maxime Leroy and Henri Gouhier. An active participant in his country's socialist movement, mentioned by historian Lucian Nastasă as "one of our country's few veritable Marxists", he contributed political essays to Șantier, a magazine on the left wing of the Romanian Social Democratic Party (PSDR). Shortly after the December 1933 assassination of Prime Minister Ion G. Duca by the fascist Iron Guard, Claudian began contributing to Gândul Vremii, a liberal nationalist magazine. His texts were explicitly anti-fascist and anti-"Hitlerite", suggesting an internationalist approach to "saving human civilization".

A member of Iași's sociological school and, in Traian Herseni's view, a bearer of Zeletin's legacy, Claudian proposed a socio-historical analysis of philosophical systems in the 1935 Cercetări filosofice și sociologice ("Philosophical and Sociological Research"). He applied this concept in two books, Colectivismul în filosofia lui Platon ("Collectivism in the Philosophy of Plato") and Originea socială a filosofiei lui Auguste Comte ("The Social Origin of Auguste Comte's Philosophy"), both published in 1936. Cunoaștere și suflet ("Knowledge and Spirit", 1940) presents his approach to the sociology of knowledge. He still could not find employment in his field, but in January 1937 was offered a lecturer's position in the Department of Logic. He accepted the proposal, even though he described it to Tudor Vianu as "rather idiotic", confessing that he considered leaving academia altogether. Claudian was for a while affiliated with, and possibly sponsored by, a dissident left-wing faction of Romanian Freemasonry, whose overseer was Mihail Sadoveanu.

=== World War II and PSDI ===
After the 1938 establishment of the National Renaissance Front single-party dictatorship, Claudian remained active in the semi-legal PSDR, a regular contributor to its newspaper, Lumea Nouă. His brother Ion and cousin Alexandru Tell, meanwhile, had drawn into the fascist opposition to the Front, openly joining the Iron Guard. Tell was executed in September 1939 as a reprisal for the assassination of National Renaissance Front Prime Minister Armand Călinescu.

In 1941, during the Guard's National Legionary State interlude, Claudian became a full professor in the department of sociology and ethics, replacing the suicidal Andrei, also teaching specialized classes on the sociology of war, the sociology of religion, and the study of social stratification. He took over for other colleagues who were on leave or had been drafted, and also taught classes at the Superior Normal School.

Scholar Adrian Marino, who was his student at that time, maintained a dim view of Claudian and his colleague, Dan Bădărău, arguing that their classes ignored the realities of war and politics. In 1944, however, Claudian made a show of his public opposition to the Ion Antonescu regime and its Nazi German alliance, signing his name to a public memo that demanded exist from the war. A few months later, he followed the university as it was evacuated into Transylvania, involving himself in the recruitment of new staff, and being instrumental in the election of Vianu's pupil Alexandru Dima. By the end of World War II, with the onset of Soviet occupation, Claudian published Antisemitismul și cauzele lui sociale, a sociological inquiry into the phenomenon of antisemitism.

As a close associate of Constantin Titel Petrescu, the anti-communist head of the PSDR, he became identifiable as the party ideologist, and a leading contributor to its press, rejecting offers of collaboration with the Communist Party. As early as January 1945, he wrote in Libertatea against the "brutal intimidation" and "simplistic, demagogic, ideas" of the "enemies of democracy, socialism and the workers"; journalist Victor Frunză claimed this text was directed against the Communists. In early 1946, as the PSDR's left was joined an electoral alliance led by the Communist Party, he remained active within Petrescu's new Independent Social Democratic Party (PSDI), running third on its list in the general election of November. Under his watch, the PSDI declared itself a non-Marxian reformist movement, "a party of revolution, but not a revolutionary party", explicitly directed against the radical ideologies taken up by the Guard and the Communist Party.

=== Repression and final years ===
In 1948, the nascent communist regime banned sociological teaching, and Claudian resorted to teaching classes on child psychology at the Faculty of Medicine. He and his wife were arrested later that year. Zoe was released, but Claudian, arrested again in August 1952, was held in confinement, first at Aiud prison, then at the Peninsula and Poarta Albă labor camps, on the Danube–Black Sea Canal. Ion Claudian, meanwhile, escaped into the anti-communist maquis, joining up with Nicolae Dabija, before fleeing to the West in 1950.

Between his release in 1954 and 1960, Claudian worked as a researcher at the Romanian Academy's Iași chapter, leading a withdrawn life at his house on Copou Hill, or at his friend Mircea Spiridoneanu's home, and often rejoining Zoe in Bucharest. From 1957, the Securitate police opened a file on him, worried about his nighttime contacts with PSDI militants, some of whom were its own informers. These suspected him of "subverting the state" and of promoting a "Western political regime", but were unable to penetrate his innermost circle of friends, and considered tapping his telephone.

Claudian died on October 16, 1962, at an urology hospital, where he was being looked after by Zoe. Two lengthy works on the sociology of literature remained in manuscript form; one deals with classical French theater, another with 19th-century French prose. (Fragments appeared in 1957–1958 in Iașul Literar and in Studii și Cercetări Științifice.) In 1972, Editura Minerva released Senin ("Halcyon"), Zoe Claudian's selection from her husband's poetry, written in a lyrically intellectual style, with problems posed in an ironic and philosophical manner.

== Work ==
Described by his peers as a "fine intellectual", "paralyzed by discreetness", or a "withdrawn scholar, without an expansive public persona", Claudian was a respected, but often overlooked, figure in Romanian sociology—according to Z. Ornea, this was "probably because, although he did take part in one annual research, he was not involved with Dimitrie Gusti's monographic school." The same was noted by Gusti's pupil, Henri H. Stahl, who saw Claudian as "for sure one of our best sociologists", but linked primarily to Zeletin, Andrei, and Sanielevici (Claudian had reportedly praised Sanielevici in particular as a "genius" anthropologist).

In his relative isolation, Claudian spent much time mapping out the socially deterministic settings of philosophical doctrines, the "collective tendencies and aspirations" that shaped individual stances, "often without the thinker himself realizing it for sure." For instance, Claudian looked into the transition from Plato's discourse on collectivist government under philosopher kings, in the Republic, to the more individualistic idealism of the Nomoi; the former reflected a collective republican ideal, while the latter showed Plato's own sobering experience of government under Dionysius of Syracuse. Likewise, he understood Comte as a "dissident" liberal, whose theoretical work, reconciling radicalism and anti-industrialism, was shaped by his frustration with the Orléanist right. The latter study was described by historian Nicolae Iorga as "excellent", but overly reliant on secondary sources and at times erroneous: "Some more history would have been appreciated."

His reflections on antisemitism, albeit published in the wake of Holocaust, were silent on that subject, and sought to explain earlier phenomena through the grid of Marx, Kautsky, and their historical materialism. This overall interpretation, Ornea argues, was "brittle and inconclusive"; however, the critic finds that certain passages still have validity. Ornea refers to Claudian's rejection of scientific racism (with references to Maurice Fishberg), his correlating of antisemitism with systemic poverty, and his critique of Sombart's theory of "Jewish commercialism". Claudian attributed antisemitic outbursts to Christian envy for the Jews' other selected qualities, including their "industriousness, moderation, strong will, perseverance".

Claudian viewed himself as "a sociologist and philosopher (of sorts)", as well as "adventurer". His "integral" and "social history of ideas", Herseni notes, emerged from sociology to take up a classical position in the history of ideas, but could also take the reverse path. According to Ornea, Claudian had merit as both a scientist and a theoretician: "Had social democracy been allowed to exist, Claudian would assuredly have become a sociological-cultural personality of the kind that people respect and hold dear." According to Marino, the book was "indisputably correct" but "in the ambiance of the day [...], totally ignored."

Claudian's published poetry evidences different preoccupations, being rated by George Călinescu as "intimist" and "typically intellectual", taking up themes such as high school reveries, reflections on what could have been, and the secretive thoughts of a nostalgic character who has to act his real age. Călinescu describes such work as "surprisingly youthful, lively", as well as "finely emotional". One such piece reads:

Scrisori, notițe și hârtii mărunte Cetite-n zile lungi de sărbătoare, Melancolia voastră nu mă doare Ci mă mângâie blând și trist pe frunte.

Notițe, "cugetări", revoltă-ascunsă De-adolescent neînțeles de lume, Sarcasme disprețuitoare, glume, Și taina metafizică pătrunsă.

Translation:

Letters, notes, and minor bits of paper,
That I once used to read on lengthy days of feast,
I feel your melancholy, not as something painful,
But, on my brow, as soft and saddening caresses.

Notes, "musings", hidden torment from
An adolescent boy the world misunderstood,
Sarcastic, deprecating, humor, and also
Insights into the metaphysical obscure.
