= Henric Sanielevici =

Romanian journalist and literary critic (1875 - 1951)

- Henric Sanielevici's portrait, published along with his books in the 1920s. Attached are Sanielevici's self-measurements, which, he claimed, proved he was of the "Dinaric race".
- Born: September 21, 1875; Botoşani
- Died: February 19, 1951 (aged 75)
- Other names: Henri Sanielevici, Henry Sanielevici, Enric Sanielevici, H. Sanielevich, Hasan

Academic background
- Influences: Georg Brandes, Georges Cuvier, Constantin Dobrogeanu-Gherea, Émile Hennequin, Karl Kautsky, Jean-Baptiste Lamarck, Gustave Lanson, Titu Maiorescu, Hippolyte Taine

Academic work
- Era: 20th century
- School or tradition: Social determinism, Marxism, Poporanism, Environmental determinism, Lamarckism
- Main interests: anthropology, ethnography, literary criticism, religious studies, sociology, zoology
- Notable works: Încercări critice (1909); Cercetări critice şi filosofice (1916); Poporanismul reacţionar (1921); La Vie des mammifères et des hommes fossiles (1926); În slujba Satanei?!... (1935)
- Influenced: Octav Botez, Alexandru Claudian, Mircea Eliade, Garabet Ibrăileanu, Petre Pandrea

Henric Sanielevici (Romanian pronunciation: [ˈhenrik saniˈelevit͡ʃʲ], first name also Henri, Henry or Enric, last name also Sanielevich; September 21, 1875 – February 19, 1951) was a Romanian journalist and literary critic, also remembered for his work in anthropology, ethnography, sociology and zoology. Initially a militant socialist from the political-philosophical circle of Constantin Dobrogeanu-Gherea, he incorporated other influences and, in 1905, created his own literary review, Curentul Nou ("The New Trend"). Sanielevici and his friend Garabet Ibrăileanu were among the founders of "Poporanism", a peasant-oriented and left-wing movement. However, Sanielevici soon detached himself from both Marxism and agrarianism, criticizing Romanian traditionalist literature, and prophesying a Neoclassicism for the working men. His heated polemic with the rival school of Sămănătorul journal isolated him from the other Poporanists, whom he eventually denounced as "reactionaries". More controversy surrounded his ambiguous attitudes during World War I.

From 1920, Sanielevici was an isolated figure on the left, editing a new version of Curentul Nou and only affiliating with the popular daily Adevărul. He moved away from literary theory and, following his anthropological speculations, revived Lamarckism and scientific racism to formulate his own racial-sociological system. Himself a Jewish Romanian, Sanielevici attempted to undermine the racial assumptions of Nazi ideologists and local fascists.

The author faded into obscurity by the 1940s, when his work was vilified by the governing fascists, then expunged by the communist regime.

== Biography ==
=== Early years ===
Sanielevici was a native of Botoşani city, in the historical region of Moldavia. His father, officially known as Leon Sanilevici, was a trader, and his mother, Rebeca, a housewife. Both branches descended from prominent Jewish community leaders—Leon's father was a Rabbi of Craiova Jews, in southern Romania, while Rebeca was the daughter of Botoşani's own Rabbi—whose ancestors had settled in the Danubian Principalities to escape pogroms in the Russian Empire. Almost all of Leon's other children grew up to become distinguished artists and intellectuals: Simion, Jacques and Maximilian were mathematicians; Solomon a painter; Iosif an economist; Emil a zoologist.

The family, whom literary historian George Călinescu describes as "utterly assimilated" into Romanian culture, was not in fact emancipated: like most Romanian Jews of that era, Sanielevici was not granted citizenship at birth. Although a self-declared atheist, Sanielevici later recommended the voluntary mass baptism of Jews. He grew up in a cosmopolitan neighborhood, alongside Romanians and Armenians; the unfamiliar suffix -ici, chosen by Henric's ancestors, misled some into believing that the family was of Serb origin.

Henric spent most of his childhood between Botoşani and various rural localities in Moldavia, among them Costeşti, Dolhasca and Podriga. The countryside, he was to recall in writing, shaped his vision of human nutrition as the source of physical and cultural differences: "Everywhere there were orchards, one to every homestead, and often with select fruit. [...] Fruit was falling on the ground in piles, without anyone even bothering to turn it into cider, at least. Countryside attics were full of huge piles, white and greenish, of peaches the size of apples [...]. Until fifteen years of age, I can only recall images of myself eating fruit all day long". The setting also inspired his naturalistic observations on poultry (he described Moldavian hens as particularly slender and prone to wade in still water), on wild birds, and even on spiders.

While he was still a student in Botoşani, the young man made his debut in the socialist press, founding and editing his own newspaper, the short-lived Proletarul. He graduated high school in his home town, and took a degree in Letters and Philosophy at the University of Bucharest.

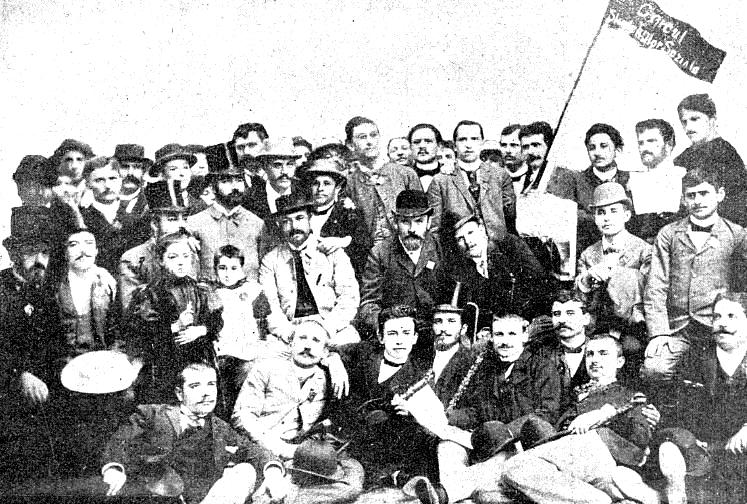
Socialist reunion in Bucharest, 1892, with Constantin Dobrogeanu-Gherea and Constantin Mille in the foreground. Henric Sanielevici is in the fourth row, third from the right; on his sides are poet Ion Păun-Pincio (right) and journalist Henric Streitman. Simion Sanielevici is same row, seventh from the right.

Together with Simion, who was Technical University student, he attended the Marxist society of Bucharest's Sotir Hall, led by Constantin Dobrogeanu-Gherea, and joined the militant Romanian Social-Democratic Workers' Party (PSDMR). Especially after the PSDMR's creation, Henric gave weekly public lectures for the workers at Sotir, where he was known under the pseudonym Hasan. The two brothers were contributors to Adevărul, at the time a socialist daily edited by Gherea's pupil Constantin Mille, and, around 1896, were also writing for its short-lived literary supplements. Henric's articles were also published in other socialist and center-left papers: Lumea Nouă, Munca, Avântul, and the Piteşti literary magazine Povestea Vorbei.

A main focus of Sanielevici's early work as a critic was defending Dobrogeanu-Gherea's Marxist literary theory against Junimea, the conservative literary society. Late in the 20th century, cultural historian Z. Ornea described how Sanielevici, Garabet Ibrăileanu, Traian Demetrescu, Anton Bacalbaşa, Emil Fagure and other "young socialists" took up the combat when Gherea remained silent, and responded with an "offensive" to the Junimist jibes. The leading Junimist theorist and cultural critic, Titu Maiorescu, issued formal retorts, responding to specific points made by Sanielevici. Nevertheless, the "young socialist" militant also published articles in the Junimea magazine, Convorbiri Literare. Additionally, he was a leading contributor to, and for a while editorial secretary of, the eclectic journal Noua Revistă Română, run by the ex-Junimist philosopher Constantin Rădulescu-Motru. It was there that he began a series of articles in defense of didacticism, with which he established his reputation as a cultural journalist. Noua Revistă Română was also the place where, some years later, Sanielevici met and befriended fellow journalist Constantin Beldie.

In 1901, Sanielevici was in the German Empire, for an academic specialization in the field of Anthropology at the University of Berlin. In 1904, he was in Paris, France, where he spoke at the Société Anthropologique. The topic of his dissertation challenged contemporary assumptions on physical anthropology, primarily the theories of Swedish physician Anton Nyström. Sanielevici spoke out against Nyström's belief that "dolichocephalic" people were abnormal. Arguing that Nyström stood against "all anthropological data", the Romanian suggested that the shape of one's skull was determined by mastication. The Société as a whole found his interpretation strange and unappealing. An influential racial theorist, Joseph Deniker, also rejected the idea, and noted in particular Sanielevici's "strange and false" argument that the only naturally "brachycephalic" skulls were "Mongoloid".

=== Curentul Nou beginnings ===
Back home, Sanielevici found steady employment was as a schoolteacher, and he successively taught French to high school students in Galați, Ploiești, Târgoviște and Bucharest. He also expanded on his activity in criticism, with the debut volumes Studii critice ("Critical Studies", Cartea Românească publishers, 1902) and Încercări critice ("Critical Essays", 1903). His focus was on questioning the established criteria of literary criticism. In particular, Sanielevici focused on the poem Mioriţa, already recognized as a staple of Romanian folklore, and made sarcastic comments about its subject matter. Together with W. Majerczik, he published a German-language translation of the novella Sărmanul Dionis ("Poor Dionysus"), by Romania's national poet, Mihai Eminescu. It saw print with the Bukarester Tagblatt company, in 1904.

While in Galaţi, Sanielevici made his name as the founder and editor of Curentul Nou, a literary review which appeared from 1905 to 1906. As the PSDMR split into competing factions (1899), he and Garabet Ibrăileanu made some efforts to regroup the scattered socialist clubs around new ideals, with an emphasis on uplifting the peasantry—an ideology that came to be known as "Poporanism". Ibrăileanu was based in the larger city of Iaşi, but Sanielevici found Galaţi more suitable a location for the Poporanist projects. In his view, Iaşi was home to a decaying Moldavian nobility, state-dependent and nationalistic, while his adoptive home was a "citadel of true democracy". In his letters to Ibrăileanu, whereby he invited him and Poporanist theorist Constantin Stere to contribute, Sanielevici acknowledged that his journal was not afraid of radicalism: "I have grown tired of hypocrisy".

With the Curentul Nou project, Sanielevici concentrated his polemical stance on the right-wing, agrarian and conservative publications of the day, and primarily ridiculed the work of writers at Sămănătorul magazine. He candidly informed Ibrăileanu: "We have a grand work to accomplish, a work that will resonate throughout Romanian literary history, the work of bringing down a shameful current that has been clutching the country for these last 5 years". However, Sanielevici was also a sporadic contributor to the Neamul Românesc review, which was founded by historian Nicolae Iorga as the new version of Sămănătorul.

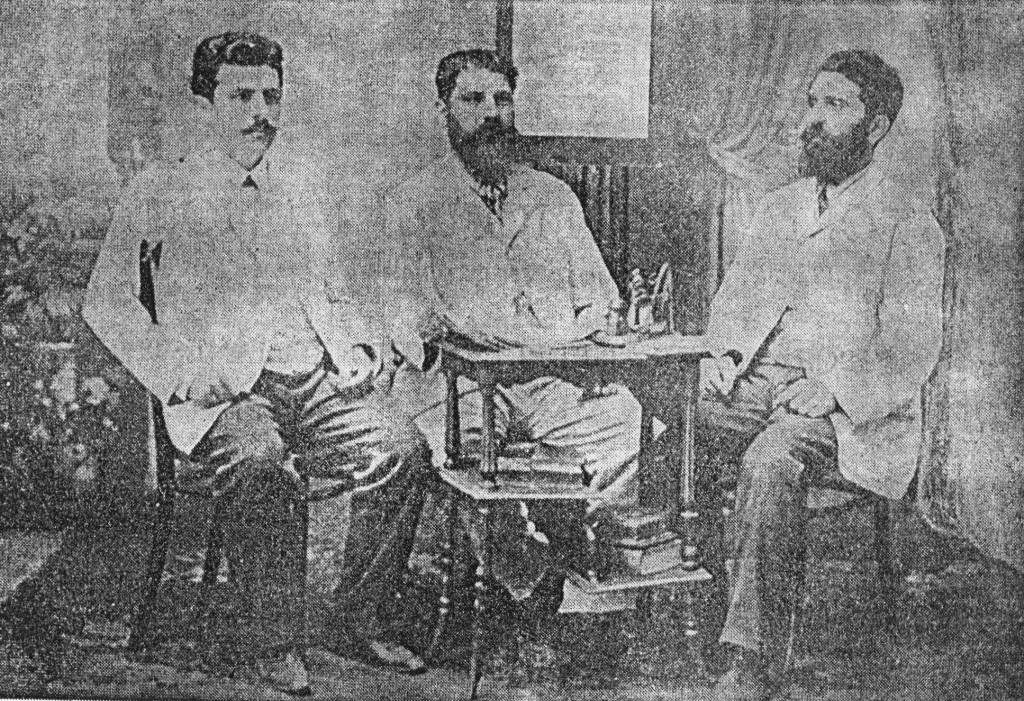
From right: Garabet Ibrăileanu, Constantin Stere and their Viața Românească colleague Ion Botez, c. 1905

In time, Curentul Nou identified itself with a new form of traditionalist, peasant-oriented, literature, as advocated by the formerly socialist "Poporanists". As noted by literary theorist Eugen Lovinescu, the Galaţi paper was a direct predecessor of the leading Poporanist monthly Viața Românească, founded at Iaşi in 1906. Ibrăileanu approached both Sanielevici and Dobrogeanu-Gherea with offers to head the editorial staff, but both, in turn, refused his invitation. At the time, the other Poporanists were beginning to protest against the Curentul Nou branch: publicist Spiridon Popescu, who was Ibrăileanu's companion, threatened to quit if the "insane" Sanielevici and "the Jewish critic" Gherea were ever on board. Sanielevici only began contributing there in 1908, and, in 1909, was made the editorial secretary. He was still mainly active in Galaţi, where, in early 1909, he joined a fundraising drive to complete a statue of Eminescu.

In his Curentul Nou period, Sanielevici focused his attention on the young novelist Mihail Sadoveanu, whose work he considered the main manifestation of Sămănătorism. To his critic's dismissive remarks, Sadoveanu replied with a violent article in the political gazette Voinţa Naţională: "I promise you a stern comeback, and do let me know if there is any clean spot on your body that may yet receive it." The first fissures between Sanielevici and his Poporanist colleagues began to show at roughly the same time. Emerging as one of the Poporanist ideologues around 1905, Ibrăileanu defended Sadoveanu against Sanielevici's observations. This stance probably helped Sadoveanu to make up his mind about leaving the Sămănătorists and joining the Viața Românească group, while the controversy only increased his exposure.

Initially, Ibrăileanu attempted to mediate between the two rivals, advising moderation: Sadoveanu wrote to him to explain that "every bit of my soul" had been wounded, while Sanielevici announced that he was ready to defend himself with a revolver, should the "bandit" novelist come after him. Probably as a direct consequence of Sadoveanu's arrival at Viața Românească, Sanielevici was sacked from his position on the editorial staff (September 1909). Reportedly, the young critic did not take the matter to heart, and continued to treat Ibrăileanu with a mix of friendliness and superiority. They were still united by their disdain toward the ex-Poporanist columnist Ilarie Chendi. In 1910, one of Chendi's antisemitic comments in the journal Cumpăna, directed specifically at Sanielevici, sparked an anti-Chendi campaign in the Viața Românească pages.

=== 1910s and World War I controversy ===
After a complicated process which involved a vote in Parliament, Henric Sanieleveci received his naturalization in November 1910. In 1911, he made his return to Germany, where he attended additional lectures in Anthropology the Göttingen University and researched the Sammlung für Völkerkunde collections. He lectured in front of the Göttingen Anthropological Society, where he first aired his assumption that the "Nordic race" traced its origin to Pleistocene-era fishermen, and enlisted negative or ironic responses from his peers. In the hope of touching a more sympathetic audience, Sanielevici published the results of his research in the Anatomischer Anzeiger.

Upon his return to Romania, despite having earned his citizenship, Sanielevici found that he could not enter the newly created Romanian Writers' Society, which had a strictly nativist agenda. The period however brought success to the other Sanielevici brothers: Simion took over the Chair of Mathematics at Bucharest University; Maximilian, turning to medical sociology, pioneered social epidemiology in Moldavia, and was later administrator of the insurance company Generala. Solomon, who was even employed as an illustrator by the Writers' Society, became a noted presence within the Bucharest Impressionist circle.

Sanielevici was still an active Poporanist by the time of World War I. During Romania's neutrality period (1914–1916), he concentrated on his literary work and, in 1916, published the biographical essay volume Icoane fugare ("Passing Icons", second edition 1921), as well as a new work of literary criticism: Cercetări critice şi filosofice ("Critical and Philosophical Studies"). Among these individual studies, one returned to Sărmanul Dionis, tracing the links between Eminescu (otherwise a textbook Junimist) and the international Romanticism of ca. 1820. Sanielevici himself considered the piece to be his best work, and one of the best essays ever written. The period witnessed the first instance of Sanielevici's recurrent publicity stunt: from then on, all copies of his books came with his autographs.

According to historian Lucian Boia, the literary critic did not follow his Poporanist colleagues in political debates: while they remained firmly on the "Germanophile" side, which advocated an alliance with the Central Powers, Sanielevici was "more interested in his own projects than in the course of events." He was still courted by the most radical wing of the Germanophiles, represented by Tudor Arghezi of the newspaper Cronica. Eventually, in summer 1916, the Bucharest protocol sealed Romania's alliance with the Entente Powers, but the resulting defeats brought the occupation of southern Romania by the Central Powers. The military clashes impacted on the Sanielevici family: Solomon was killed in combat with the intruding armies.

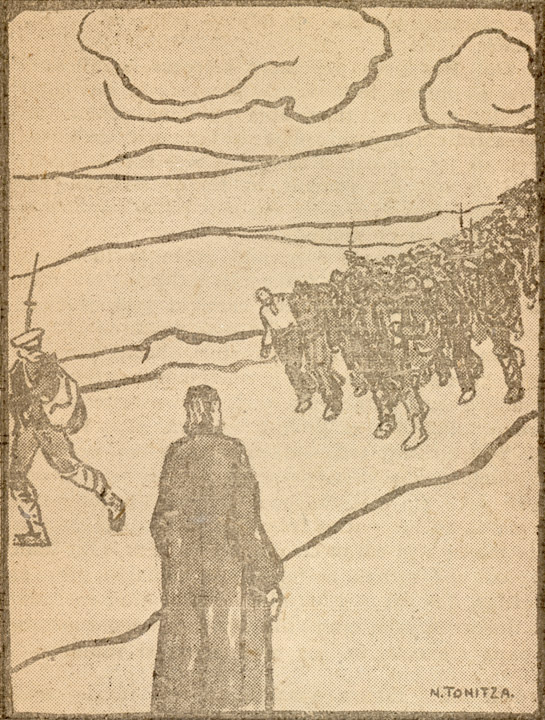
Romanian prisoners' convoy in Bulgaria, 1920 drawing by Nicolae Tonitza

Henric himself was one of the hostages taken by the German Army after the taking of Bucharest. According to a fellow captive, he was one of several Jews on a multi-ethnic prisoners' convoy, deported to Bulgaria under armed guard. Together with other schoolteachers and academics (Rădulescu-Motru, Dumitru Tilică Burileanu, Gheorghe Oprescu), he was kept in Bulgarian concentration camps, at either Troyan or Etropole. He spent a full year in captivity. A rumor circulated by his nationalist adversaries had it that Sanielevici irritated the occupiers with his critique of German interests in Romania. According to this account, he tried to justify himself to his captors by noting that "only in this [patriotic] way could he create himself a basis for his criticism among the Romanian people." Sanielevici's posthumous biographer, Adrian Jicu, notes the opposite: "Although it may seem hard to believe, on many occasions Sanielevici proved himself more of a patriot than his Romanian national contemporaries."

The accusations, publicized by the antisemitic journal Weltkampf (of the Militant League for German Culture), quoted from an anonymous author. According to them, the "cheeky" Sanielevici, known as V. Podriga, had authored articles against Germany, before taking up assignments as a German agent of influence and proceeding to denounce his literary friends. The same source acknowledged that Sanielevici was imprisoned by the occupiers, but attributed this to his "Jewish pride": according to his accusers, the Poporanist critic gave himself away when passages from the Podriga articles made it into his Germanophile pieces.

Once released from captivity, Sanielevici returned to occupied Bucharest, and, exposing himself to accusations of collaborationism, began his contribution to Lumina, a newspaper put out by Germanophile-Poporanist Constantin Stere. His articles there, Boia notes, were apolitical, but his correspondence of the time showed that he leaned toward the Germanophile camp. This change occurred in mid 1918, after Romania agreed to a separate peace with the enemy, when he resumed contacts with the Poporanists who had fled to Moldavia. In October 1918, believing that the turn of events had confirmed the Germanophiles' justness, and their leadership position in Romanian culture, Sanielevici began working on a literary supplement for Stere's newspaper.

The late switch in allegiance was, according to Boia, a "strange thing": Sanielevici entertained such prospects precisely as German capitulation was occurring worldwide, and Romania was marking its return into the Entente camp. For this reason, Boia includes Sanielevici among a group of Romanian intellectuals who seemed "confused by the war", changing sides at the most inauspicious moments.

=== Adevărul writer ===
In 1920s Greater Romania, Henric Sanielevici continued to publish works of literature and social science. In 1920, Bucharest's Editura Socec issued his Noi studii critice ("New Critical Studies") and Probleme sociale şi psihologice ("Social and Psychological Issues"). In 1919, Sanielevici had turned against his socialist roots. As he wrote, "the West is not heading into socialism, but into a state of equilibrium between the bourgeoisie and the proletariat".

A year later, he announced his break with Poporanism, relaunching Curentul Nou with a distinct cultural platform. Financially supported by Sanielevici, the new edition counted among its contributors the woman writer Constanţa Marino-Moscu and the philologist Giorge Pascu. Sanielevici himself was contributing to Lumea Evree, the Jewish Romanian community bimonthly, put out in Bucharest by philosopher Iosif Brucăr.

1921 deepened Sanielevici's conflict with the Poporanists, after he published at Socec the volume Poporanismul reacţionar ("Reactionary Poporanism"). For Sanielevici, Poporanism and its Peasants' Party successors were glorifying in the peasantry a "viscous" class, and believed that lower-class frustrations needed to be kept in check by the adoption of "limited absolutism".

Early in the 1920s, Sanielevici returned as a contributor to Adevărul, while also printing his articles in its sister newspapers—Dimineaţa, Adevărul Literar şi Artistic. He was for a while an editor for the latter gazette. Sanielevici also contributed to the Adevărul publishing company, translating, from the Spanish, Vicente Blasco Ibáñez's Vuelta del mundo de un novelista (as Călătoria unui romancier în jurul lumii). In 1924, the Adevărul group also published Sanielevici's new book of criticism, which, in its title, introduced his reference to "proletarian classicism" (Clasicismul proletariatului). Sanielevici's term referred to self-exiled Romanian writer Panait Istrati, whose socialist-themed novels enjoyed breakthrough success in Western Europe.

The Sanielevicis were heavily involved in supporting the newly emancipated Jewish community of Greater Romania. Iosif Sanielevici was a Jewish member of the Romanian Senate in the 1922 legislature, and noted for his interventions in legislating medical practice. In 1926, Adevărul Literar şi Artistic published Henric Sanielevici's inquiry into the Jewish origins of Vasile Alecsandri, the celebrated founder of 19th-century Moldavian Romanticism. A significant part of Sanielevici's press contributions was dedicated to uncovering the Jewish roots of some eminently Romanian authors: he claimed that all people by the name of Botez (literally, "baptism"), including poet Demostene Botez, were converted Jews.

Sanielevici's other works included the Alte cercetări critice şi filosofice ("Some More Critical and Philosophical Studies", Cartea Românească, 1925) and Probleme politice, literare şi sociale ("Political, Literary and Social Issues", Ancora publishers, ca. 1925). In 1926, he also printed his French-language work of paleoanthropology: La Vie des mammifères et des hommes fossiles déchiffrée à l'aide de l'anatomie ("The Life of Mammals and Fossilized Humans Deciphered Using Anatomy"). The next year, he returned with a work on comparative racialism, Noi probleme literare, politice, sociale ("New Literary, Political, Social Issues").

With his Adevărul articles, Sanielevici continued to participate in the debates animating Romanian society. In March 1929, he wrote with skepticism about the Romanian prohibition lobby, but proposed the introduction of pasteurized grape juice in lieu of Romanian wine. In 1930, Adevărul company published two other titles: Literatură şi ştiinţă ("Literature and Science"), followed in 1935 by the anti-fascist tracts of În slujba Satanei?!... ("In Service to Satan?!...", 2 vols.). Alte orizonturi ("Other Horizons") was another Adevărul-published work by Sanielevici; it does not carry a date, but was presumably published in or around 1930. In 1932, he reviewed the literary contributions of Junimist academic Ion Petrovici, who had been a sympathetic ear for Sanielevici's theories on race. Also undated are the books Sanielevici issued as part of the Dimineaţa book collection: La Montmorency ("In Montmorency", No. 15 of the series), În tren ("On the Train", No. 40), Familia Lowton ("The Lowton Family"), Civilizaţia ("Civilization").

During the early 1930s, Sanielevici repeatedly tried to receive a university-level appointment. He unsuccessfully ran against the Poporanist Paul Bujor for the Natural Science Chair at the University of Iaşi, where his brother Simion was (since 1920) Lecturer of Mechanics and Geometry. Frustrated in his ambition, and still obliged to make his living as a professor of French, Sanielevici began working on a pro domo, borrowing its title from Sărmanul Dionis. Deploring the general state of affairs, the author complained that his tracts, although widely circulated among students, were not enough to earn him an academic promotion, and that he and his family were "starving" (Sanielevici also boasted that his books had sold over 35,000 copies in 15 years).

=== Final decades ===
Some of Sanielevici's later scholarly work evidenced a focus on ethnography, religious studies and folkloristics. As he himself noted, these themes preoccupied him during his work for Adevărul. The articles, collected in Literatură și știință volume, discussed Romanian ethnography back to the ancient tribes of Dacia: Arta țăranului romîn este curat mediteraniană ("The Art of the Romanian Peasant Is Plainly Mediterranean"), Rasa, limba și cultura băștinașilor Daciei ("The Race, Language and Culture of Dacia's Aboriginals"), Strămoșul nostru aurignacianul ("Our Ancestor, the Aurignacian Man").

In December 1930, Viața Românească published his lengthy essay linking the Dacians, modern Romanian food culture and the ecstatic rituals of 20th century sects in Bessarabia. With an article in Adevărul Literar şi Artistic, he discussed the supposed links between the poem Mioriţa and the legendary Dacian prophet Zalmoxis (Mioriţa sau patimile lui Zalmoxis, that is "Mioriţa or the Passion of Zalmoxis"). These ideas were expanded upon in another 1930 volume, Literatură şi ştiinţă ("Literature and Science"). The topic of race continued to preoccupy him and, in 1937, produced the volume Les génératrices, les origines et la classification des races humaines ("The Generators, Origins and Classification of Human Races", published with Émile Nourry's company in Paris).

Henric Sanielevici survived World War II, but was exposed to menacing scrutiny by the successive antisemitic and fascist regimes (see Romania in World War II). As early as July 1940, the literary supplement of Universul daily nominated Sanielevici, Dobrogeanu-Gherea and many other Jewish authors as ones "who could never have contributed to our people's spiritual unity", calling for a boycott on their work. At a time when many Jewish authors were officially banned, George Călinescu published his main work of literary history, which, despite reviewing Sanielevici with much irony, did not obey the order to obliterate Jewish contributions. The fascist press retorted with aggressive comments, some of which depicted Călinescu as a secret admirer of Sanielevici's.

However, the Ion Antonescu regime was lenient on Sanielevici. In 1943, he was included in a special category of Jews who received, by dispensation, a re-naturalization as Romanians. Henric's brother, Simion, and his nephew, Alexandru, were sacked from academia, but managed to find parallel employment at the unofficial Jewish College.

The end of Antonescu's rule brought a relaxation of antisemitic measures, but, during the build-up to a Romanian communist regime, Sanielevici was again disenfranchised. Shortly after the anti-Nazi coup of August 1944, he was welcomed into the reformed Romanian Writers' Society. Before his 1951 death, scrutiny of his work came from the part of communist censors, who included Poporanismul reacţionar on a list of banned writings. The document's stated agenda was the purge of "fascist" or "Nazi" literature—Sanielevici's inclusion therein, critic Al. Săndulescu notes, showed the ulterior and "aberrant" purpose of the list.

== Work ==
=== Social determinist ===
==== Beginnings ====
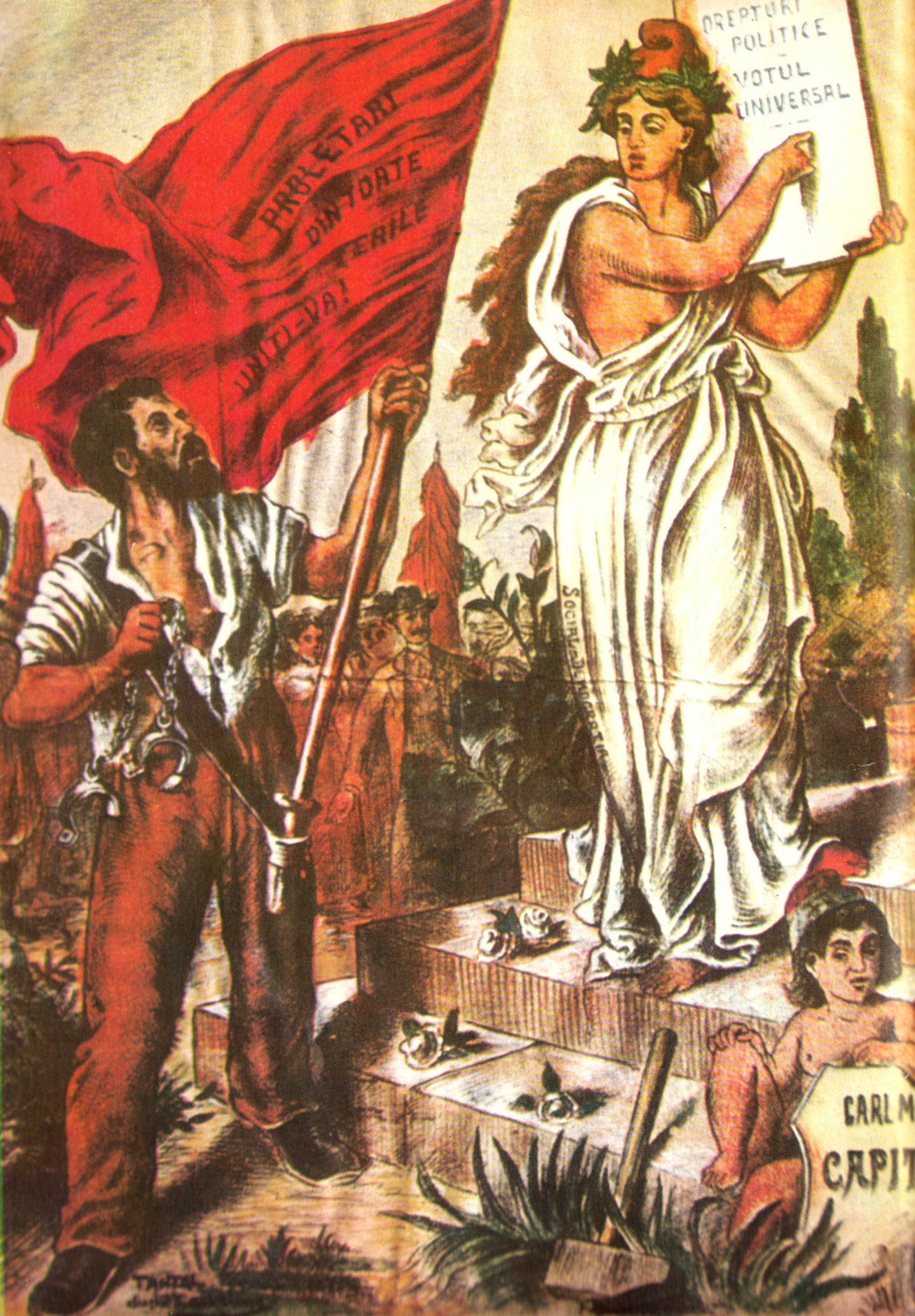
An allegory of workers' emancipation and social democracy, published by Constantin Dobrogeanu-Gherea's Lumea Nouă magazine (1895)

With his debut in professional criticism, Henric Sanielevici was the proponent of essentially Marxist concepts, as adapted to Romanian life by philosopher Constantin Dobrogeanu-Gherea. According to Sanielevici's rival Călinescu, the Încercări critice author always remained committed to Gherea's dialectical materialism and "excessively ethical" Marxist humanism, which had shaped the Romanian socialists' didactic literature even before his time. Another scholar of the period, Tudor Vianu, writes that Sanielevici started out as the main "continuator" of Dobrogeanu-Gherea's ideas on culture. At Curentul Nou, the young critic followed the "Gherist" line, to which time added the influence of other historicist or deterministic thinkers, primarily direct borrowings from Hippolyte Taine.

The impact and relevance of such ideas were investigated by several other academics. Adrian Jicu argues that the main influences on the Romanian author were Georg Brandes, Karl Kautsky, Gustave Lanson and Émile Hennequin, in addition to Dobrogeanu-Gherea and Taine. Another author, Leonida Maniu, argues that, early on, Sanielevici was a social determinist wholly under Gherea's spell, including when it came to the "rigor and elementariness" of his deductions. Similarly, critic Doris Mironescu sees Sanielevici's theories as having "deep roots in Gherea's socialism" and a foreign model in Taine's historicism, with only vague personal additions. According to Sanielevici's own account, what had been "idolatrous love" turned into "hatred and contempt" toward Gherea, and then toward historical materialism.

Sanielevici's public profile and eccentricity created irritation and even scandal in his day, as summarized by writer and scholar Antonio Patraş: "[he was remembered as] an eccentric figure, a lampoonist with diverse preoccupations [...], sometimes perceived as an intelligent and cultured critic, but overall an autodidact with the exorbitant pretensions of an uomo universale and the insufferable airs of a decadent cleric, with a holier-than-thou attitude." While describing himself as the leading cultural factor of the nation, "one of the greatest creators ever produced by mankind", Sanielevici noted that he was struggling against "lightning and hailstorm" launched by his envious peers. Moreover, he claimed, "there almost isn't one publicist, literato, politician" to have refrained from plagiarizing his ideas.

In his profile of Sanielevici, Eugen Lovinescu mentions a "lampoonist's deformation and stylistic violence", "lucidity in expression" and many other talents, as well as a "noble", but misguided and distorted, passion for turning "crude material" into science. He adds: "H. Sanielevici's style, much like his entire personality, suffers from a twofold shift in balance: firstly in the verbal violence and then in the morbid self-awareness." In his own retrospective work, Călinescu also proposed that Sanielevici was an essayist more than an actual critic, praising his texts as evidences of "great literary skill" ("gracious" works, with charmingly "voluptuous poetry", but also "bizarre" in content). He remarked that, while Sanielevici could prove himself "a talented polemicist", the assessments he made displayed such "enormity" as to become "inoffensive". Similarly, Z. Ornea discusses Sanielevici and his traditionalist rival Ilarie Chendi as "tested polemicists", "excellent at organizing and mapping out campaigns"; he notes however that Sanielevici was "haughty beyond measure", and all too imaginative. In later overviews, Jicu found that Sanielevici was "narcissistic" and self-promoting, but not an ignorant, while Patraş, who concedes that Sanielevici came up with some new ideas of importance in literary analysis, judges him as one who alternated scientific endeavors with mere journalism.

==== Neoclassicism and socialism ====
According to authors such as Ornea and Constantin Ciopraga, Henric Sanielevici was most productive and interesting as a literary theorist, and only so until ca. 1911. At the time, Sanielevici's study of and contribution to Romanian literature sought to uphold the Classical and Neoclassical models, reinterpreted by him through a socialist grid. He suggested that the dominating Neoclassical form promoted through Junimea was in actuality Neoromanticism, and that the only true Neoclassical Junimist was a minor author, Ioan Alexandru Brătescu-Voineşti—Maiorescu replied, "both [of Sanielevici's] assessments strike us as strange." In defining what he meant by "Classicism", Sanielevici continued to borrow from Maiorescu's ideal of "formal purity", but expanded it to mean narratives so restrained and so immersing "that we don't even pay attention to the words". In his memoirs, Sanielevici ventured to state that his own writing was generally "more elegant" than Maiorescu's, and "precise" in the manner of 18th-century literati.

Against the Junimists, Gherea's disciple was slowly visualizing an "optimistic" and "balanced" Classicism that was not aristocratic, but rather could belong to any social class "at the peak of its domination". However, in discussing the delayed Romanticism of Mihai Eminescu's work, Sanielevici spoke of "genius", and boasted having been the first to describe Eminescu as a poet of European proportions. Leonida Maniu credits him with having been the first exegete to document Eminescu's kinship with German idealism and, in particular, with Novalis' "magic idealism". For Doris Mironescu, the work on Sărmanul Dionis remains one of Sanielevici's most commendable efforts.

Like the Junimists, Sanielevici took a critical view of the historical liberal movement, and in particular of its founding myth, the Wallachian Revolution of 1848. His belief, described by political scientist Victor Rizescu as "interesting" and "intriguing", was that the Romanian liberals had not been responsible for modernization, but, quite the contrary, had dedicated themselves to imposing an oligarchy over the economy and obscurantism over the national ideology. He described the liberal program of modernization as "the bitter fruits" of 1848, and suggested that Romanian conservatism was a complex, sometimes positive, phenomenon, "the harsh chiding of a parent saddened to see his child taking the wrong path". Sanielevici believed that criticism of Junimism as a German-imported ideology was "not entirely exact", proposing that Romanian conservatism and its German model shared a belief in "organic" rather than "revolutionary" nation-building. In his account, which became a standard of Romanian scholarship, Junimea happened because a portion of Romania's young intellectuals were exasperated by the continuous revolutionary mood of French politics, and looked into the steadier evolutionism proposed by German teachers. Critical of this perspective, Mironescu dismisses Sanielevici's view of the Wallachian 1848ers as "proletarian rage".

In sociology, Sanielevici's own contribution rested on Maiorescu's early stance against "forms without concept" (or "forms without substance")—that is, vague elements of modernization hurriedly imposed on a still primitive society. This affiliation notwithstanding, "forms without concept" was used by Sanielevici and other socialists against the very political core of Junimist ideology. Scholar Alexandru George notes the irony that Gherea and his "baroque" disciple were reviving a conservative concept in a Marxist context: "according to the so very slow evolutionism of Junimea, [they themselves] represented a dangerous form without concept, [...] proving that ideas took precedence, and thus, that ideology took precedence over a society's 'needs', in what was a denial of Maiorescu's stance."

==== Polemic with Sămănătorul ====
Sanielevici's early attacks focused on the literary school which promoted ethnic nationalism as the source of artistic truth, namely the magazine Sămănătorul and its editor Nicolae Iorga. Călinescu summarized the resulting conflict as follows: "It was against the nationalist tendentiousness that the intelligent Jewish man H. Sanielevici sought to promote a sort of Classicism, with his Curentul Nou magazine". In his Curentul Nou manifesto of 1906, Sanielevici suggested that Sămănătorist culture was anti-Western retrogressive autarky, comparing the Sămănătorists themselves to Liberian mulattoes and Chinese Boxers. Furthermore, he argued, Iorga and the others had never lived the lives of their peasant heroes, and had failed to understand the motivations of land laborers.

Beyond such rhetoric, Sanielevici rejected the traditionalism of Sămănătorul right-wingers not because of its didacticism, but because of its supposed inconsistencies. Researchers argue that he was simply prone to attack Sămănătorul "at any opportunity", and was motivated by the wish to "counter Iorga". Overall, Eugen Lovinescu argues, his was a "sentimental deception", sparked by the revelation that Iorga's followers were all Neoromantics. Consequently, Sanielevici alleged that the Sămănătorist stories, about violent and promiscuous hajduks, or about modern-day adulterous affairs, set bad moral examples and were needlessly titillating. He also rejected the heroic portrayals of hajduks and ancient warlords, as a glorification of the "barbaric past". Politically, Sanielevici believed it was his patriotic duty to react against the "invasion of the peasants into the cultured layers [of society]".

Around 1905, before he joined the Poporanists, Mihail Sadoveanu was the prime target of Sanielevici's anti-Sămănătorism. The Marxist critic was especially reductive when it came to Sadoveanu's "baroque" brand of literary naturalism: "not naturalism, but pure bestiality. Mr. Sadoveanu has the soul of a Wachtmeister. When a Wachtmeister tells you that he 'has lived', it means that he has been to many drunken parties and has had many women". The first (amiable) split between Ibrăileanu and Sanielevici was about their different interpretations of Sadoveanu's stories. Outside commentators were perplexed by the obscure rationale of their debate. According to a 1906 column by writer Marin Simionescu-Râmniceanu: "That which Mr. Sanielevici finds to be poisonous for our society in Sadoveanu's work, Mr. Ibrăileanu will judge to be the absolute opposite. [...] Whatever Curentul Nou has said over one page, regarding Sadoveanu's work, is denied on the other. Wouldn't it then have been better not to have said it at all?" Writing in 2003, literary historian Nicolae Manolescu suggested that the reason was entirely subjective: "It is practically impossible to comprehend for instance why H. Sanielevici found Sadoveanu's prose to be so violent in subject and primitive in style, while [...] Ibrăileanu and others readily viewed it as profoundly balanced and artistic in manner." Jicu is inclined to believe that Sadoveanu was more the "collateral victim" of Sanielevici's attack on Iorga, and that Sanielevici was at his worst in assessing the quality of Sadovenian writings.

While battling Iorga's Neoromanticism, Sanielevici proposed a radical change of themes: he recommended a "religion" of balanced and moral life, with literary works about "regular and assiduous labor, the tranquil family life, honesty, economy, sobriety, diligent industry, and delicate sentiments". As Mironescu writes, Sanielevici's Classicism was averse to nostalgia, frustration and rebellion, and naturally focused on the materially secure social classes. In the early years, his sympathy went to the humanism, literary realism and economic determinism of young novelists coming in from Transylvania, primarily Ioan Slavici—whose books show Romanian peasants holding their ground against feudalism, then capitalism. Writing from within this trend, Simionescu-Râmniceanu ridiculed Sanielevici's moral agenda, and especially the advocacy of universal suffrage by literary means: "why not also for reforming municipal services in provincial towns, or for introducing soybean cultures in the villages?" In 2009, Mironescu found the idea of a Transylvanian "peasant classicism" to be "freakish".

In addition, Sanielevici demanded that Romanians revisit "the ancestral law" of Romanian Orthodoxy, and noted that the spread of militant atheism was a positive development. Călinescu sees Sanielevici, and "any Jewish writer", as actually denouncing the antisemitic component of Sămănătorist nationalism. Sanielevici, he argues, was attacking virility in literature precisely because it highlighted the "national preservation" of Romanians, and actually raising awareness about the promised emancipation of the Jews. Călinescu also notes the controversy sparked once Sanielevici's exposed some leading voices of Romanian nationalism, beginning with Vasile Alecsandri, as secret Jews: "[His] denunciation of various writers' foreignness shows subtle humor, pointing at the rickety nature of claims about one's ethnic novelty." Călinescu's younger colleague Dumitru Micu issued a similar objection, arguing that the "megalomaniac" Sanielevici displayed a "cosmopolitan hatred for the nation's past" (an opinion in turn criticized by Jicu).

==== Poporanism vs. "proletarian classicism" ====
Henric Sanielevici's uncompromising rejection of Romanian liberalism was what separated him definitively from both Ibrăileanu and Lovinescu. Victor Rizescu argues that Sanielevici's scrutiny of the liberal mindset, answering to liberal theorists such as Lovinescu to Ştefan Zeletin, reveals a minor voice in social and cultural analysis, but also a powerful exponent of democratic thinking. Lovinescu describes Sanielevici as primarily a Poporanist ("albeit with intermittent enmities"), rating him the third figure of importance after "prophet" Constantin Stere and militant Ibrăileanu. Early in the 20th century, he notes, Sanielevici was also the editorial voice of Viaţa Românească in its lengthy press debate with Junimist author Duiliu Zamfirescu. Ibrăileanu himself acknowledged, in 1910, that Sanielevici was "an intelligent man, with a clear mind, an original way of thinking, [...] a subtle spirit and an elegant form", who helped Poporanism in its fight against "decadence", and who discovered the talents of Brătescu-Voineşti. In his own analysis of the latter's work, Ibrăileanu even borrowed from Sanielevici, building on the idea of a readjusted Classicism.

However, in the 1920s, Sanielevici was rekindling Dobrogeanu-Gherea's polemic with his "reactionary" Poporanist students, and, according to Lovinescu, was right to do so. With Lovinescu, Zeletin, Vintilă Brătianu and some of the younger intellectuals, Sanielevici represented the minority current which supported and justified industrialization and Westernization, against the self-preservation of agrarian lifestyles. As summarized by Jicu: "The Curentul Nou editor [believed] that, after the war, the Romanian milieu had entered the era of those social changes that Poporanism was hindering. Hence the logical necessity of discrediting it." A 1920 notice in Luceafărul expressed support for the "temperamental erudite" in times of "social upheaval", when "few people understand him and many grumble about him."

Lovinescu however remarks that Sanielevici was still committed to the core concept of Poporanism and Sămănătorul, namely a "failure to differentiate between aesthetics and ethics". In Lovinescu's account, Sanielevici considered himself a new Iorga, and a "missionary" among the mass of people: "aesthetically, he still endures as a Poporanist, albeit one with a different political ideology." As noted by Jicu, Sanielevici tellingly oscillated in his reviews of Sadoveanu's Poporanism. A while after the 1905 scandal, he admitted that Sadovenian novels showed an able author, but in 1921 returned to say: "[Sadoveanu] has since civilized himself, without gathering in talent".

Before 1930, Sanielevici also reached the conclusion that, after an era of realism, a new, "proletarian", form of moralizing classicism was emerging in prose. He believed that the novels of international vagabond Panait Istrati, whom he described as vastly superior to Sadoveanu's naturalist works, were an early proof of this change. Sanielevici's idea was received with sarcasm by T. Vianu, who replied: "Mr. H. Sanielevici, to whom, he informs us, we owe the 'shattering discovery' that realism is always succeeded by classicism, saw in Istrati's Oncle Anghel the affirmation of his theories and the dawn of a new era in moral health. Mr. Sanielevici's proclamation regarding Istrati came with the immolation of one hundred and fifty writers published in contemporary reviews, and this enormous sanguinary drive gave us the surprise of noting that classical moderation does not always keep company with the practice of temperance." Vianu also parted with Sanielevici's comments about the supposedly classical quietude and political reformism of Istrati and his protagonists: "Their moral is not social, because they are not sheltered by it and because they seek to escape its sanctions. [...] That Mr. H. Sanielevici was able to detect in this the representatives of qualified, almost bourgeois, workers is by now only an instructive example of how systemic prejudice may lead astray any particular judgment."

As Istrati's apologete, Henric Sanielevici hoped to rescue proletarian works from the concentrated attacks of nationalists and traditionalists. According to writer Ioan Lascu, Iorga and Octavian Goga had thrown Istrati's novels into "the tough mixer of nationalist passions", while Sanielevici, "for all his critical servitude", was agitating for cultural openness. The nationalist reviewer Ion Gorun reacted strongly against "heimatlos" Istrati's promotion from the left, denouncing Sanielevici as one of "our recent guests", the purveyor of "spiritual anarchy" and of "trumped-up critical nonsense". In the end, Sanielevici's argument failed to satisfy even his social democratic colleagues. Writing for the socialist newspaper Şantier, militant journalist Lothar Rădăceanu strongly criticized the notion of "proletarian classicism". He contrarily asserted that Istrati was the portraitist of unsociable marginals, who had isolated himself from the working class environment.

Sanielevici's novel ideas on politics made it into his other essays. Besides its overall anti-fascism, În slujba Satanei?!... features his criticism of other public figures, mainly agrarian and Poporanist politicians. The language, Călinescu notes, is "inimitable". Sanielevici accuses C. Stere of senility, judges Ibrăileanu a "weak critic", and dismisses Viaţa Românească columnist Mihai Ralea, who "is very bad at coordinating"; he also describes the post-Poporanist National Peasants' Party as laughable when in government. În slujba Satanei's other targets are foreign writers and critics whom Sanielevici disliked, from world federalist author H. G. Wells to modernist novelist André Gide.

=== Aspiring anthropologist ===
==== Lamarckist evolutionism ====
A constant of Henric Sanielevici's career was provided by his perspective on anthropology, which became his leading preoccupation in the interwar period. For Sanielevici, this came with a new epistemology, which rated "orientation" (bridging logic, dialectic and intuition) above all other scientific faculties, prophesying a new stage in social science: the accurate description of deterministic relationships. Using Messianic language (provocatively so, according to Jicu), he stated: "I am he whom you announce is to come down through the ages. I created the science that is real, cleansed of all conventional lies: the science of causal reports and of laws that coordinate things occurring." The Curentul Nou editor also attempted to test his theories in political science and economics, but Doris Mironescu cautions, his efforts there should not be taken for granted.

Sanielevici believed that he had revolutionized knowledge, describing himself as a Newton of biology and arguing that he had provided the world with the most accurate paradigm of human evolution. Following Jean-Baptiste Lamarck's ideas about the inheritance of habits, Sanielevici deduced anthropology from zoology. According to him, Lamarckism was the only credible school of evolutionary thought; Darwinism, Weismannism, Mutationism and the Vitalism of H. Driesch were all sterile and irrelevant. In addition to criticizing Anton Nyström, the Romanian anthropologist reacted strongly against the anatomical theories put forth by Australia's Grafton Elliot Smith, whom he "damned to hell", and derided the phrenological collections of Johann Friedrich Blumenbach and Franz Joseph Gall.

Some of his own essays offered novel explanations to the emergence of biological functions: in an early article for Noua Revistă Română, he reportedly suggested that the purpose of bird singing was the prevention of asphyxia. He later came to the conclusion that the very evolution of mammals was made possible by the abundance or scarcity of food: the ancestors of such animals were arboreal and viviparous reptiles, who evolved into lighter and more agile species while continuously searching for food sources; an exception was the proverbially slow-moving sloth, whose feed, the slugs, was in abundance. Sanielevici explained hair growth on mammals (humans included) as an adaptation to humidity, while differences in skin pigmentation reflected exclusively the nature of the soil and the specimen's own blood circulation.

Such contributions were received with astonishment or derision by the scientific community, although, Călinescu writes, his "extravagances" show "incontestable intelligence and erudition." Jicu notes that the theories he advanced were often "strong", "supported by hard work", "extremely inventive" and "not that strange as claimed", but that practice failed Sanielevici. According to Lucian Boia, he was "an erudite and a dreamer", with "a very personal approach" to social science, while literary historian Dumitru Hîncu notes that Sanielevici's "involuntary humor" overshadows his "unquestionable culture". Some commentators describe Sanielevici as spiritually related to the 19th-century liberal historian Bogdan Petriceicu Hasdeu, and rate their overall approach to research as Romanian pseudoscience.

==== Nutrition and human races ====
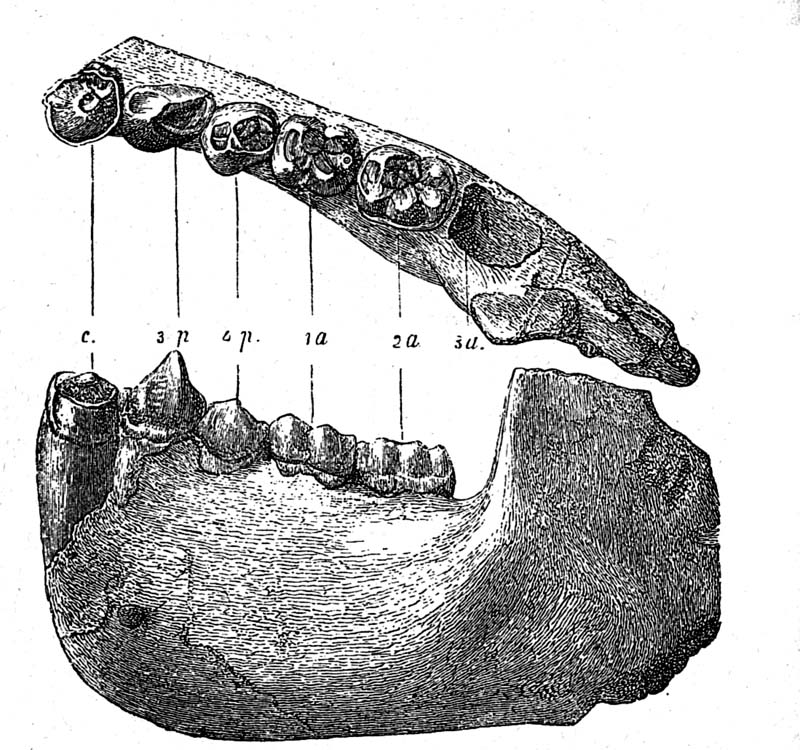
Dryopithecus jaw (1893 illustration to Jovan Žujović's Kameno doba)

Sanielevici's interest in the subject of race is steeped in his work as a literary critic, and expands on the theses of more mainstream determinism. This happened once Sanielevici discarded Gherea's Marxism and looked into environmental determinism to record "the laws that have governed the birth of literary production", explaining: "literary criticism led me to study anthropology. The path is, contrary to how one might think, short and straight." Gherea's method, he argued, was only applicable on a case-by-case basis, whereas "racial psycho-physiology" explained phenomena occurring at a universal scale. Accusing Gherea of having exaggerated and falsified Marxism, he tried to reconcile determinisms with the single formula: "Class struggle and racial psychology, those are the two factors of social evolution. The latter is more general and more important than the former."

Ciopraga notes that, in his "continuous agitation", Sanielevici reduced Taine's deterministic concept of "race, milieu and moment" to "climate and food". Applying Lamarckism to the study of human character, Sanielevici also regarded physiognomy as a relevant clue to evolutionary history. The conclusion, called "surprising and ridiculous" by Jicu, was that one's writing style was influenced by race, diet, jawline and even eye color. Reviewing his colleague's ideas in a 1933 essay, Vianu noted: "In those studies where Mr. Sanielevici builds such considerations, literature effectively turns into a material reused into theories that surpass aesthetics." Ornea also notes that such "fixations" ruined Sanielevici's literary career, turning him into a "dilettante" of anthropology.

Sanielevici partly rejected, partly nuanced, the historical definitions of race and the tenets of scientific racism. Călinescu paraphrases his core idea: "races are affinities of an anthropological kind, reaching beyond the supposedly historical races." Thus, the main criterion available for differentiation and classification of human races was human nutrition. Already in 1903, he argued that Mongols, "the least mixed" people of the "yellow race", were "brachycephalic" because they consumed raw meat, and thus required stronger temporal muscles. In La Vie des mammifères..., Sanielevici postulated that racial clusters had emerged around staple foods, corresponding to regional patterns in the Stone Age diet. In his account, a European megaflood had pushed Dryopithecus out of the canopy, replacing its diet with nuts, pushing it toward bipedalism, and then turning it into modern man. The Romanian author distinguished five basic racial and dietary types, based on the archeological cultures and each created by its own foodstuff: Aurignacian (allium plants, beans), Chellean (nuts), Magdalenian (fish), Mousterian (snails, fruit) and Solutrean (meat, horses). These types corresponded to the environmental divisions, respectively: warm steppe, warm woods, tundra, cool woods, cold steppe.

Sanielevici's grid rated the Tungusic peoples as Solutrean, and the modern-day Italian people as "grass"-eaters, proposing that the "impulsive" behavior of Jews was owed to a high nitrogen intake, from beans. The Han Chinese were descendants of the Aurignacians, having a rice-based "rodent" diet, which strained their muscles to create the epicanthic fold. Black people and their Spanish relatives, he conjectured, owed their darker skin to the intoxicating contact with laterites, also responsible for "impulsiveness". By 1916, Sanielevici's racial perspectives had incorporated definitions of race popular in early 20th-century scholarship. In this context, he argued that the "Nordic race" had created Classicism and epic poetry, that didactic realism was an "Alpine" feature, and that "Mediterraneans" were at the source of Romanticism.

The book and theory were reviewed with much skepticism by the foreign scholars to whom they were addressed. L'Année Psychologique journal, which noted that Sanielevici was reviving the ideas of Napoleonic era naturalist Georges Cuvier, concluded with irony: "One evidently needs a rich imagination such as [Sanielevici's] to pierce through the mysteries of paleontological life for animals and humans that have vanished for so long. The author, who has full confidence in his intuition to guide him, has no doubt as to the certitude of his convictions." Jean Piveteau, the vertebrate paleontologist, wrote: "To me, it does not seem worth discussing this new biological theory at length. For sure [...] the reader will identify in it quite a few Lamarckian reminiscences; but [these] will be precisely the most annoying passages from Lamarck". Biologist Georges Bohn also asked rhetorically: "[Sanielevici's] excessive imagination, might it not also be the result of spiritual intoxication from the plants and the soil?"

==== Racialism ====
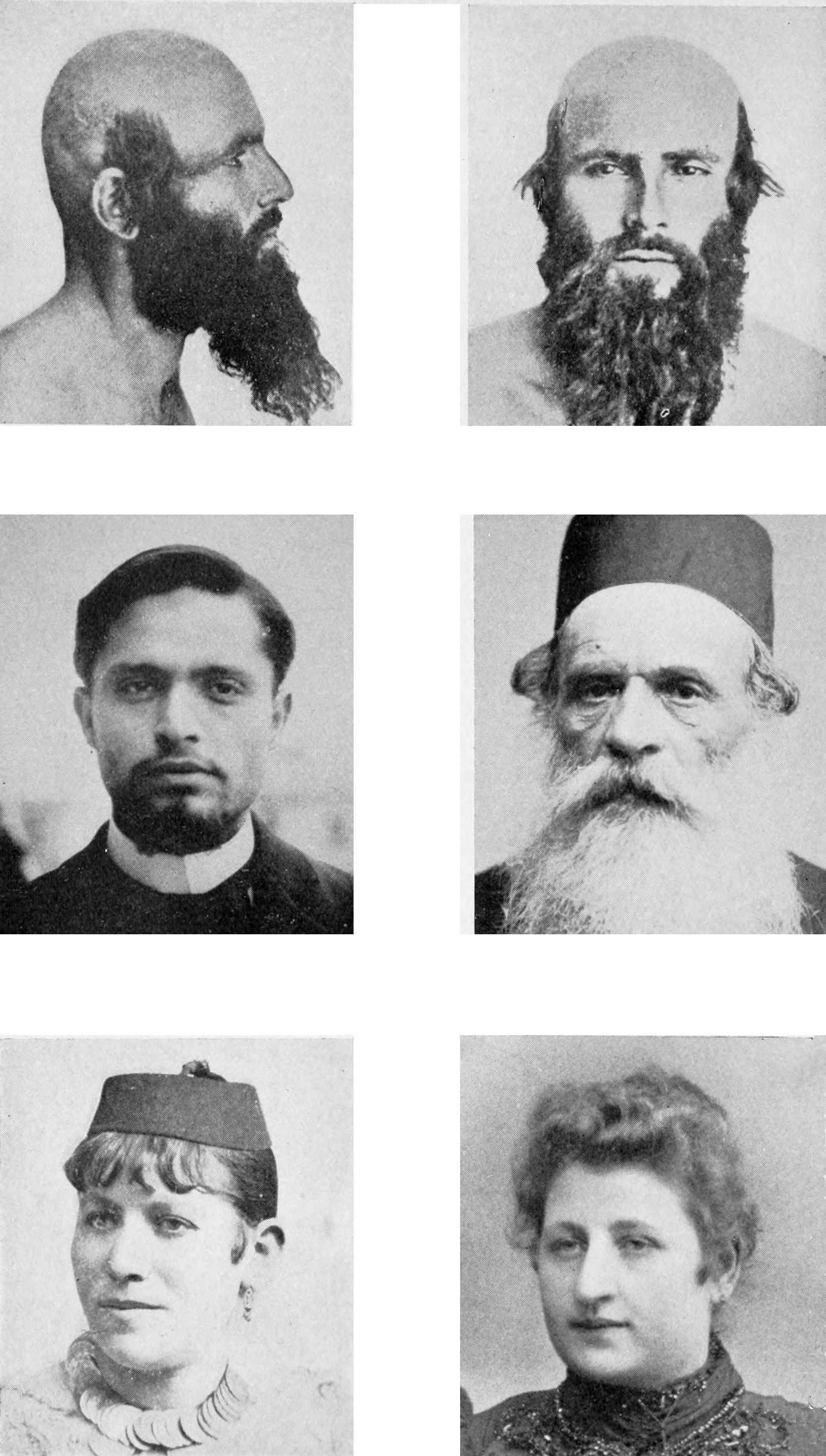
Purported "Jewish types". Popular Science illustration, 1898

The Romanian scholar sought to redefine the concept of a "Semitic race", which he described as fluid and independent of Jewishness. Overall, he found "Semitism" in any sexually driven, "Dionysian", culture, and concluded that the "Mediterranean race" as a whole was Semitic. The Semitic trait was, in his definition, the purest modern stage of the Aurignacian man. In 1930, after reading French archeologist Fernand Benoit, Sanielevici concluded that the Aurignacian-Semitic-Dionysian connection was unaltered among the Berber people of North Africa.

With În slujba Satanei?!..., Sanielevici reacted against Nazism, discussing Germany's racial antisemitism, Aryan race doctrine and racial policies. The text suggested that Adolf Hitler was an Antichrist, and negatively quoted from Eugen Fischer, the Nazi racial theorist, to show that Nazism had perverted earlier forms of racialism. Expanding on his own interpretation of "Semitic race" concepts, Sanielevici distinguished between the Jews, who belonged to several races, and the Semites, only some of whom were Jewish. The racial traits, he suggested, were hidden, recurrent and vague: the recessive characteristics made races divisible into "classes" and "subclasses".

Sanielevici illustrated his point with craniometry, publishing comparative photographs of Jews and ethnically unrelated people (Russians, Frenchmen, Germans), concluding that their physical measurements were nearly identical. He also included photographs of himself and his family, for whom he reused the concept of a "Dinaric" race, with Western Asian characteristics. Concluding that his own personality was "Dinaric", and ethically driven, he also suggested that his son Ipolit (Hyppolyte), was not Dinaric, but "Dalic". The latter category was Sanielevici's answer to the Aryan theory: a superior race found in Atlantic Europe, the "Dalic" peoples stood above the "Dinarics" and the "Nordic" Germans—the Nordics being a "gregarious" and easily dominated human group.

The racial hierarchy implied by such contributions received contradictory, often negative comments from Sanielevici's peers. Călinescu argued that Sanielevici is in fact the voice of anti-racism in the Romanian context, and one who uses racist ideas against themselves. As a supporter of Semitic race theories, Călinescu also wrote that the photographic evidence was inconclusive, since a "Hebrew note" of character still set the Jews apart in all samples, including wherever Sanielevici referred to his family. Historian of medicine Marius Turda notes that Sanielevici's pronouncements form part of a larger cultural phenomenon, under which racism and eugenics became fashionable, both within and without the Romanian far right. Although he defines Sanielevici as a "pro-racist", researcher Lucian Butaru notes that his ideas questioned the racist mindset of his contemporaries, in the same vein as the Adevărul columnist Doctor Ygrec (Glicsman) and the conservative anti-fascism of philosopher P. P. Negulescu. He considers Sanielevici's a "bizarre" racist discourse, like those of Alexandru Randa or Iordache Făcăoaru, but separated from them by an enduring belief in democracy, and "less quoted because of [his Jewish] origin".

In his tracts, Sanielevici suggests that the Romanian ethnicity and the Romanian Jewry are both racial conglomerates, not racial entities. He speaks about fundamental differences occurring between people from the distinct Romanian historical regions—Moldavia, Wallachia, Transylvania etc.—with many hybrid individuals straddling the supposed divides. La Vie des mammifères... postulated that the Moldavians were Mousterian-Magdalenians originally feeding on fruit, fish and snails, whereas Wallachians (or, more restrictively, Muntenians) represented the Aurignacian-Solutrean mixture—horses in summer, and mainly onions in winter. In later writings, he argued that the whole of Wallachia's population, as well as some Moldavians, fit in with the Semitic and Mediterranean prototype.

In 1930, Sanielevici noted: "22 years ago I was the first to draw attention to the oriental [Sanielevici's italics] character of Romanian peasant art, into which is mirrored the oriental soul of the Thracians". He also claimed that the "Dinaric" and "Alpine" subsets, well represented in Romania, ranked better than the "Nordic" people, if lower than the "Dalic". In Călinescu's interpretation, Sanielevici attributed to the natives of Transylvania some characteristics which were defining for Jews: "thus [he] fashions himself a Transylvanian and therefore more of a Romanian than the Romanians [from other regions]." Applying his racial interpretation to Romanian writers, Sanielevici compared traditionalists Alexandru Vlahuţă and Sadoveanu: the dark-faced Vlahuţă, with his eyes "black as oil", was a "Mediterranean" and a Romantic, displaying the "hidden excitement and concentrated nature of a Spaniard"; Sadoveanu was blond and stocky, therefore "Slavic" in appearance and "Germanic" in psychology, but also of "Alpine impulsiveness".

==== Religious and folkloric studies ====
A corollary to his anthropological work, religious studies formed a distinct part of Sanielevici's research. Sanielevici believed his work in the field was as groundbreaking as his study of races: "The research I carried into the history of religions has plainly revealed to me some truths that nobody so far seems to have perceived." A primary focus of his work was the differentiation between religious practice at a racial level: the "Semitic" or "Dionysian" religion grouped together the ancient worship of Osiris, Sabazios and Attis, the Dionysian and Eleusinian Mysteries, Jewish mythology, Berber mythology, the Phallic saints and Waldesian lore. Sanielevici further argued that the fertility rites and chthonic traditions shared between these religious cultures were polar opposites of "Nordic" beliefs in the sky gods, and came from the intoxicating properties of the Aurignacian diet.

In 1930, basing himself on press reports, Henric Sanielevici turned his attention to the Messianic movements of Bessarabia, and in particular the Inochentist church. The latter had recently broken up with Russian Orthodoxy, forming a Charismatic group with its own version of Christian lore. The Inochentists allegedly preached mortification and sacred prostitution, reminding Sanielevici of the Orthodox sectarian activity depicted by Dmitry Merezhkovsky in his philosophical novels, and reviewed by him as a northernmost afterthought of Semitic-Dionysian religions.

The period also witnessed Sanielevici's interest in Paleo-Balkan mythology and the origin of the Romanians, the ancient Dacians, and the supposed Dacian cult leader Zalmoxis. He traced a continuous "Dionysian"-type religious practice leading back to the Cucuteni-Trypillian culture (30th century BC), and suggested that there was a connection between Cucuteni pottery markings and the geometric abstraction of modern folk art. In his interpretation, the latter was at once a local variant of Dionysus and the founder of Romanian hesychasm.

Sanielevici believed to have also detected traces of Zalmoxian and Dionysian practice in various elements of Romanian folklore, reading Mioriţa as a codified record of human sacrifice in Dacian times. Around 1901, he had dismissed Mioriţa as a crude and absurd poem, noting that its protagonists displayed a suicidal indifference to murder, "instead of calling the police". Literary historian Alex. Ştefănescu describes Sanielevici's comment as mere reification, "as if someone were to ask why King Lear won't book himself a hotel room". A transition was already evident in La Vie des mammifères..., where Sanielevici suggests that Mioriţa, like Tristan and Iseult, is a wonderful sample of "intoxicated", African-like, mentalities in the heart of Europe. By 1930, Sanielevici had revised his own argument: his Mioriţa sau patimile lui Zalmoxis formed part of a resurgence in Dacian studies and essayistics. Writing in 2006, University of Turin academic Roberto Merlo includes it among a list of period works that focused in large part on Zalmoxis, with various interpretations to his story; other authors cited therein include Dan Botta, Mircea Eliade, Alexis Nour, Lucian Blaga and Theodor Speranţia. As such, Sanielevici's final take on the poem described the shepherd's indifference as a ritualized initiation into death.

== Legacy ==
Touched by controversy and repressed by both nationalists and communists, Sanielevici's work has been ignored by the general public in the decades after he died. Marxist sociologist Henri H. Stahl reports: "Sanielevici is an isolated dissident, read for only as long as a momentary interest lasted for his paradoxical polemics, then forgotten and in any case unable to group around him either disciples or offspring." Writing in 2009, Antonio Patraş noted that the sociologist had "sunk into oblivion even when alive, later to be literally buried into the darkness of totalitarianism". In 2010, Adrian Jicu described Sanielevici as "almost unknown", despite the "revolutionary" role he had in the "interdisciplinary" study of literature, and despite the pains Sanielevici took to make himself memorable as a "Dinaric" racial specimen.

Some noted figures in cultural history were still inspired by Sanielevici's works in various ways. One Poporanist author is believed to have been directly influenced by Sanielevici during the Curentul Nou years: Octav Botez, later in life a disciple of Ibrăileanu. As a young man, philosopher and religious scholar Mircea Eliade was "captivated" by one of Sanielevici's studies, and "read all Sanielevici's books." According to Eliade, he shared this passion with his high school teacher, the philosopher and socialist theorist Alexandru Claudian, who described Sanielevici as an anthropologist "of genius". Sanielevici's work was reviewed by Adrian Marino, the aspiring literary historian, in his debut essay—published in 1939 by George Călinescu's paper Jurnalul Literar. By then, another young author, Petre Pandrea, was shedding light on Sanielevici's Marxist roots, and declaring himself inspired by the critique of "reactionary" Poporanism, but also deploring his rejection of "peasantist" politics.

Totalitarian censorship was reversed later during communism, with a spell of relative liberalization. Constantin Ciopraga inaugurated this recovery in 1964, when Luceafărul published his study of Sanielevici's literary essays. In 1968, Editura pentru literatură, a state-run company, reissued Cercetări critice şi filosofice with Z. Ornea as editor. Ornea (according to Jicu, the "most important" of Sanielevici revivalists) also wrote a Sanielevici monograph, part of the volume Trei esteticieni ("Three Aestheticians").

After the 1989 Revolution, new steps were taken to reclaim and reassess the less debated aspects of Sanielevici's contribution to culture. In 2009, Jicu published with Cartea Românească a new monograph, widely considered an attempt to rekindle interest in the critic-anthropologist: Dinastia Sanielevici. Prinţul Henric, între uitare şi reabilitare ("The Sanielevici Dynasty. Prince Henric, in between Oblivion and Rehabilitation"). However, according to Jicu, there are few other 21st-century works dealing with Sanielevici's contribution. Mironescu argues that Jicu's own effort missed the mark: Sanielevici, he argues, was "compromised" and "defeated" by his own "tastelessness" and "over-the-top verbal violence".
