= Mirra Komarovsky =

American sociologist

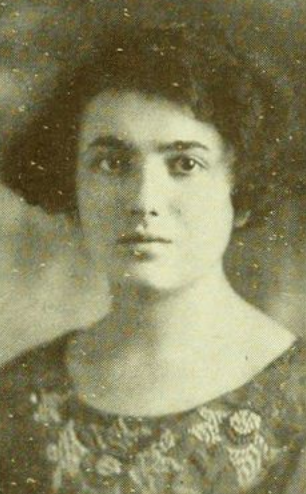
- Mirra Komarovsky, from the 1926 yearbook of Barnard College
- Born: February 5, 1905; Baku, Russian Empire
- Died: January 30, 1999 (aged 93); New York City, U.S.
- Education: Barnard College B.A.; Columbia University M.A., Ph.D.
- Occupations: Professor of Sociology at Barnard College (1938–1970); Chair of the Women's Studies Program at Barnard College; President of the American Sociological Association (1973–1974)

Mirra Komarovsky (February 5, 1905 – January 30, 1999), was an American pioneer in the sociology of gender.

== Early years ==
Born to Mendel and Anna Komarovsky (née Steinberg) in a privileged Jewish family in the Russian Empire, her family fled the country after the 1917 Russian Revolution. Komarovsky's parents were Zionists and landowning Jews in Akkerman, Russia, until tsarist police drove them from their home. They moved initially to Baku (in what is now Azerbaijan) and then to Wichita, Kansas after the Bolshevik Revolution, when Mirra was 16. In Baku, Komarovsky lived a solidly middle-class lifestyle; she was homeschooled by private tutors and learned Russian, English, Hebrew, and French, as well as playing the piano.

== Life in the United States ==
Once in the United States, she graduated from Wichita High School within a year and in 1922, she was admitted to Barnard College as part of the class of 1926. One of her professors, sociologist William Ogburn, advised her not to pursue higher education, largely because of the prescribed gender role and anti-semitism at the time. Nonetheless, she earned her master's degree from Columbia University and proceeded to earn her Ph.D.

== Komarovsky as a sociologist ==
Komarovsky's dissertation topic, which she stumbled upon in 1935 through a research position with mathematician Paul Lazarsfeld at the New York Institute for Social Research, was “The Unemployed Man and His Family." She earned her Ph.D. in Sociology in 1940 from Columbia University because of this work. Later published as a book, The Unemployed Man was an intensive study of fifty-nine families in the qualitative sociological method.

Komarovsky built her legacy on researching the social and cultural attitudes of families. Much of her work focused on the idea of “cultural lag,” in which the cultural attitudes surrounding women generally lag behind technological and social advances. Throughout the rest of her career, she continued to study the role of women and the outlooks of society towards those roles. She became one of the first social scientists to look critically at gender and the role of women in society.

Professor Komarovsky retired in 1970 after 32 years on the faculty of Barnard College. But she returned to Barnard in 1978 and became the chairwoman of its women's studies program until 1992

In 1973 and 1974, she became the second woman after Dorothy Swaine Thomas to be president of the American Sociological Association. Her research during the 1980s tracked many of the changes taking place in the consciousness of young women and their life choices in response to the feminist movement.

== Personal life ==
In 1940, she married Marcus A. Heyman. She died at New York City on January 30, 1999.

== Notable works ==
- Leisure: A Suburban Study, 1934
- The Unemployed Man and His Family, 1940
- Women in the Modern World. Their Education and Their Dilemmas, 1953
- Common Frontiers of the Social Sciences, 1957
- Blue-Collar Marriage, 1964
- Sociology and Public Policy, (1975)
- Dilemmas of Masculinity: A Study of College Youth, 1976
- Women in College. Shaping New Feminine Identities, 1985.
