= Inevitability thesis =

Inevitability thesis is term that has been applied to a number of theories, including:

- Daniel Chandler's thesis that once technology is introduced, it is inevitably developed
- Steven Goldberg's thesis that inevitable male dominance is rooted in physiological differences between men and women
- F. Hayek's thesis in The Road to Serfdom that any amount of central control inevitably leads to totalitarianism
- S. Huntington's thesis in The Clash of Civilizations that modernization of the third world inevitably begets violence
- Immanuel Kant's position that people inevitably make fallacious inferences from the dialectical syllogisms
