= Pace of innovation =

Speed at which technological advancement is occurring

Pace of innovation is the speed at which technological innovation or advancement is occurring, with the most apparent instances being too slow or too rapid. Both these rates of innovation are extreme and therefore have effects on the people that get to use this technology.

== Technology moving too slowly ==
A technology with a slow pace is one that has its developments delayed or under-emphasized due to different factors or barriers. Major barriers include technosocial momentum that advance an alternative innovation, lack of adequate monetary funds, and social factors. Non-automobile based cities progress too slowly today in the US in comparison to those that are based around automobiles. This acts as a barrier to high speed trains and other forms of mass transit in most cities. Another example of a slowed technology is the male birth control pill which has been researched since the 1920s and still a working product has not ended up on the market. The slow progress and acceptance of the male birth control pill is largely associated with budget issues where it lacks the funding to perform proper research. A male contraceptive that is nearly 100% effective has yet to be found, and testing can run millions of dollars. Conversely, since many of the technologies are long-term solutions for men, pharmaceutical companies are resistant to further development of products that are not constantly making money. Those contraceptives that have been found to work, whether they are pills or herbal remedies, but they have adverse side effects that are less than desired by men. This social barrier has also slowed the progress of the male birth control pill as men do not naturally experience the emotional feelings of menstruation and pregnancy.

The slow pace of technology not only affects products, but entire fields, such as green chemistry. Social and organizational barriers have prevented green chemistry from becoming a viable field, whereas brown chemistry's technological momentum remains strong. A lack of environmental considerations in professional licensing exams for chemical engineers prevents a shift to a more benign chemical education that reflects the integrity of the natural planet. Since this field is relatively new, definitions and standards are still vague, leading to organizational barriers. There is no large-scale green chemistry database or comprehensive reference, which limits the progress being made in the field. Companies that make green technologies or produce tools to measure green performance are often proprietary and not easily applicable to other firms. Barriers like these can cause a technology to stumble or to not move at all. This causes some goods not to go into production due to lack of funding.

== Technology moving too fast ==
The description of technology moving too fast is that innovation is proceeding faster than expected or than the consumption rate of the goods due to a quick rate of production. The main reason why innovating too fast is undesirable is that the technology tends to have unintended consequences caused by the lack of adequate trial and error, including deliberation among all parties involved in the use of a product. There are numerous examples in history that point out the unintended consequences of innovating too fast. The manufacturing of the Ford Pinto during the 1960s through 1970s, occurred due to fast manufacturing of the vehicles before adequate testing could be done. This led to the production of an ineffective product that caused the deaths and injuries of numerous people when the Ford Pinto was involved in an accident. Another example of innovating too fast is suburbanization, which occurred due to the ease of access into big cities in combination with lower suburban housing rates. This had the unintended consequence of reducing the tax funds for inner urban areas and undermined the effectiveness of public transport due to the long distances needed to be traveled. This also led to the increase of small vehicle sales, which played a part in the deterioration of the environment particularly due to air pollution.

Lack of deliberation amongst the parties to be involved in a technology may also lead to a rapid pace of innovation mainly due to publicity that a project may gain making it difficult to oppose the original plan leading to the technological momentum in that particular field. For example, the NASA Space Shuttle project led to large publicity which made it more difficult to stop the project when it started being costly. Lack of deliberation during the decision made to build large nuclear reactors during the 1970s, caused nuclear energy to have a technological momentum. In the case of nuclear power plants, there was also no gradual scale up of the power plants which made it difficult and costly to implement changes after trial and error. Other examples of technology proceeding too quickly are product iterations that occur from the treadmill of consumption. With consumer goods, such as CD players, vacuums, and lint rollers, being produced with such variety that lead to various resource inefficiencies, products are being modified at an unnecessarily rapid pace. To create a market for the numerous goods produced, manufacturers create low quality goods that do not last for long and advertise extensively which creates an endless cycle of consumerism.

== See also ==
- Culture lag
- Diffusion of innovations
- Disruptive innovation
- Progress trap
- Prosophobia
