= Proletarul (1892) =

Proletarul ('Proletarian') was a socialist newspaper published from Botoșani, Kingdom of Romania. The newspaper began publishing on 1 March (O.S.) (13 March (N.S.)), 1892. It was the organ of the Workers Club of Botoșani. It was managed by an editorial committee. Amongst the contributors to Proletarul were Dr. Panait Zosin and Henric Sanielevici. It was published twice monthly, the typography was done as Goldșleger & Comp.
