= Technological determinism =

Reductionist theory

Technological determinism is a reductionist theory in assuming that a society's technology progresses by following its own internal logic of efficiency, while determining the development of the social structure and cultural values. The term is believed to have originated from Thorstein Veblen (1857–1929), an American sociologist and economist. The most radical technological determinist in the United States in the 20th century was most likely Clarence Ayres who was a follower of Thorstein Veblen as well as John Dewey. William Ogburn was also known for his radical technological determinism and his theory on cultural lag.

== Origin ==
The origins of technological determinism as a formal concept are often traced to Thorstein Veblen (1857–1929), an influential American sociologist and economist. Veblen, known for his work on social and economic issues, introduced ideas that portrayed technology as a powerful, autonomous force capable of shaping societal norms and structures. He argued that the development and use of machinery exerted an independent influence on human thought and behavior, notably asserting that "the machine throws out anthropomorphic habits of thought."

=== Historical Context and Influences ===
During Veblen's time, rapid industrialization and advancements in technology were radically altering American society. Innovations in manufacturing and transportation, such as the assembly line and railroads, demonstrated technology's potential to reshape economic and social structures. These changes helped popularize the idea that technology could independently drive societal evolution, creating the conditions for Veblen's ideas to resonate widely.

=== Influence of Karl Marx and Expansion by Clarence Ayres ===
Although Veblen is credited with coining the core ideas behind technological determinism, the influence of Karl Marx on these ideas is also significant. Marx argued that technology drives historical change by shaping the "material base" of society. For instance, he suggested that the railway in colonial India would challenge and erode the caste system by introducing new economic activities and altering social hierarchies. Later, Clarence Ayres, a 20th-century economist inspired by Veblen, expanded on these ideas by introducing the concept of "technological drag." According to Ayres, technology progresses as a dynamic, self-generating force, while traditional institutions often lag, resisting the transformative potential of technological change. Ayres' theory further solidified technological determinism, emphasizing the inevitable clash between technological progress and social conservatism.

== Explanation ==
Technological determinism seeks to show technical developments, media, or technology as a whole, as the key mover in history and social change. It is a theory subscribed to by "hyperglobalists" who claim that as a consequence of the wide availability of technology, accelerated globalization is inevitable. Therefore, technological development and innovation become the principal motor of social, economic or political change.

Technological determinism has been defined as an approach that identifies technology, or technological advances, as the central causal element in processes of social change. It has been described by different scholars as "the belief in technology as a key governing force in society" (Merritt Roe Smith); as "the idea that technological development determines social change" (Bruce Bimber); and as the three-word logical proposition that "technology determines history"' (Rosalind H. Williams). It is the belief that social progress is driven by technological innovation, which in turn follows an inevitable" course. Technological determinism presumes that technology dictates users' behaviors. Therefore, technological determinism implies that "technological progress equals social progress." Therefore, technological determinism is a common ideology in international development aid, assuming that the transfer of modern technology to underdeveloped contexts will lead to social and economic development in the context where it has been implanted.

Key notions of this theory are separated into two parts. The first being that the development of the technology itself may also be separate from social and political factors, arising from "the ways of inventors, engineers, and designers following an internal, technical logic that has nothing to do with social relationships".

As technology changes, the ways in which it is utilized and incorporated into the daily lives of individuals within a culture consequently affect the ways of living, highlighting how technology ultimately determines societal growth through its influence on relations and ways of living within a culture. To illustrate, "the invention of the wheel revolutionized human mobility, allowing humans to travel greater distances and carry greater loads with them". This technological advancement also leads to interactions between different cultural groups, advanced trade, and thus impacts the size and relations both within and between different networks. Other examples include the invention of language, expanding modes of communication between individuals, the introduction of bookkeeping and written documentation, impacting the circulation of knowledge, and having streamlined effects on the socioeconomic and political systems as a whole. As Dusek (2006) notes, "culture and society cannot affect the direction of technology...[and] as technology develops and changes, the institutions in the rest of society change, as does the art and religion of a society." Thus, technological determinism dictates that technological advances and social relations are inevitably tied, with the change of either affecting the other by consequence of normalization.

This stance however ignores the social and cultural circumstances in which the technology was developed. Sociologist Claude Fischer (1992) characterized the most prominent forms of technological determinism as "billiard ball" approaches, in which technology is seen as an external force introduced into a social situation, producing a series of ricochet effects.

Rather than acknowledging that a society or culture interacts with and even shapes the technologies that are used, a technological determinist view holds that "the uses made of technology are largely determined by the structure of the technology itself, that is, that its functions follow from its form" (Neil Postman). However, this is not the sole view of TD following Smith and Marx's (1998) notion of "hard" determinism, which states that once a technology is introduced into a culture what follows is the inevitable development of that technology.

The other view follows what Smith and Marx (1998) dictate as "soft" determinism, where the development of technology is also dependent on social context, affecting how it is adopted into a culture, "and, if the technology is adopted, the social context will have important effects on how the technology is used and thus on its ultimate impact".

For example, we could examine the spread of mass-produced knowledge through the role of the printing press in the Protestant Reformation. Because of the urgency from the protestant side to get the reform off the ground before the church could react, "early Lutheran leaders, led by Luther himself, wrote thousands of anti-papal pamphlets in the Reformation's first decades and these works spread rapidly through reprinting in various print shops throughout central Europe".

== Hard and soft determinism ==
"Soft determinism", as the name suggests, is a more passive view of the way technology interacts with socio-political situations. Soft determinists still subscribe to the fact that technology is the guiding force in our evolution but would maintain that we have a chance to make decisions regarding the outcomes of a situation. This is not to say that free will exists, but that the possibility for us to roll the dice and see what the outcome exists. A slightly different variant of soft determinism is the 1922 technology-driven theory of social change proposed by William Fielding Ogburn, in which society must adjust to the consequences of major inventions, but often does so only after a period of cultural lag.

== Criticism ==
In his article "Subversive Rationalization: Technology, Power and Democracy with Technology," Andrew Feenberg argues that technological determinism is not a very well founded concept by illustrating that two of the founding theses of determinism are easily questionable and in doing so calls for what he calls democratic rationalization (Feenberg 210–212).

Another conflicting idea is that of technological somnambulism, a term coined by Winner in his essay "Technology as Forms of Life". Winner wonders whether or not we are simply sleepwalking through our existence with little concern or knowledge as to how we truly interact with technology. In this view, it is still possible for us to wake up and once again take control of the direction in which we are traveling (Winner 104). However, it requires society to adopt Ralph Schroeder's claim that, "users don't just passively consume technology, but actively transform it".

Historian David E. Nye has observed that although most historians of technology reject technological determinism, the idea remains influential in public live, where it can lead citizens to believe they have no say in how new technologies shape their future.

Among those in opposition to technological determinism are those who subscribe to the belief of social determinism and postmodernism. Social determinists believe that social circumstances alone select which technologies are adopted, with the result that no technology can be considered "inevitable" solely on its own merits. Technology and culture are not neutral and when knowledge comes into the equation, technology becomes implicated in social processes. The knowledge of how to create, enhance, and use technology is socially bound knowledge. Postmodernists take another view, suggesting that what is right or wrong is dependent on circumstance. They believe technological change can have implications on the past, present and future.

== Notable technological determinists ==
Some interpret Karl Marx as advocating technological determinism, with such statements as "The Handmill gives you society with the feudal lord: the steam-mill, society with the industrial capitalist" (The Poverty of Philosophy, 1847), but others argue that Marx was not a determinist.

Technological determinist Walter J. Ong reviews the societal transition from an oral culture to a written culture in his work Orality and Literacy: The Technologizing of the Word (1982). He asserts that this particular development is attributable to the use of new technologies of literacy (particularly print and writing,) to communicate thoughts which could previously only be verbalized. He furthers this argument by claiming that writing is purely context dependent as it is a "secondary modelling system" (8). Reliant upon the earlier primary system of spoken language, writing manipulates the potential of language as it depends purely upon the visual sense to communicate the intended information. Furthermore, the rather stagnant technology of literacy distinctly limits the usage and influence of knowledge, it unquestionably effects the evolution of society. In fact, Ong asserts that "more than any other single invention, writing has transformed human consciousness" (Ong 1982: 78).

== Media determinism as a form of technological determinism ==
Media determinism is a form of technological determinism, a philosophical and sociological position which posits the power of the media to impact society. Two foundational media determinists are the Canadian scholars Harold Innis and Marshall McLuhan. One of the best examples of technological determinism in media theory is Marshall McLuhan's theory "the medium is the message" and the ideas of his mentor Harold Adams Innis. Both these Canadian theorists saw media as the essence of civilization. The association of different media with particular mental consequences by McLuhan and others can be seen as related to technological determinism. It is this variety of determinism that is referred to as media determinism. According to McLuhan, there is an association between communications media/technology and language; similarly, Benjamin Lee Whorf argues that language shapes our perception of thinking (linguistic determinism). For McLuhan, media is a more powerful and explicit determinant than is the more general concept of language. McLuhan was not necessarily a hard determinist. As a more moderate version of media determinism, he proposed that our use of particular media may have subtle influences on us, but more importantly, it is the social context of use that is crucial. See also Media ecology. Media determinism is a form of the popular dominant theory of the relationship between technology and society. In a determinist view, technology takes on an active life of its own and is seen be as a driver of social phenomena. Innis believed that the social, cultural, political, and economic developments of each historical period can be related directly to the technology of the means of mass communication of that period. In this sense, like Dr. Frankenstein's monster, technology itself appears to be alive, or at least capable of shaping human behavior. However, it has been increasingly subject to critical review by scholars. For example, scholar Raymond Williams, criticizes media determinism and rather believes social movements define technological and media processes. With regard to communications media, audience determinism is a viewpoint opposed to media determinism. This is described as instead of media being presented as doing things to people; the stress is on the way people do things with media. Individuals need to be aware that the term "deterministic" is a negative one for many social scientists and modern sociologists; in particular they often use the word as a term of abuse.

== See also ==
- Instrumental conception of technology – Philosophical concept
- Determinism – Belief that events are determined by prior ones
- Historical materialism – Marxist theory of history and society
- History of science and technology
- Orthodox Marxism – Body of Marxist thought, prominent until World War I
- Philosophy of technology – Studies of the nature of technology
- Theory of the productive forces – Technological determinism in Marxism
- Path dependence

== Footnotes ==
- [as cited in Croteau, D. and Hoynes, M. (2003) Media Society: Industries, Images and Audiences (third edition), Pine Forge Press, Thousand Oaks pp. 305–306]
