= William Fielding Ogburn =

American sociologist (1886–1959)

William Fielding Ogburn (June 29, 1886 – April 27, 1959) was an American sociologist who was born in Butler, Georgia and died in Tallahassee, Florida. He was also a statistician and an educator. Ogburn received his B.A. degree from Mercer University and his M.A. and Ph.D. degrees from Columbia University. He was a professor of sociology at Columbia from 1919 until 1927, when he became chair of the Sociology Department at the University of Chicago.

He served as the president of the American Sociological Society in 1929. He was the editor of the Journal of the American Statistical Association from 1920 to 1926. In 1931, he was elected as the president of the American Statistical Association, which also elected him as a Fellow in 1920. He was also known for his idea of "Cultural lag" in society's adjustment to technological and other changes. He was elected to the American Academy of Arts and Sciences in 1932. He played a pivotal role in producing the groundbreaking Recent Social Trends during his research directorship of President Herbert Hoover's Committee on Social Trends from 1930 to 1933. He was elected to the American Philosophical Society in 1940.

He was one of the most prolific sociologists of his time, with 175 articles under his name.

== Social change ==
Perhaps Ogburn's most enduring intellectual legacy is the theory of social change he offered in 1922. He suggested that technology is the primary engine of progress, but tempered by social responses to it. Thus, his theory is often considered a case of Technological determinism, but is really more than that. Ogburn posited four stages of technical development: invention, accumulation, diffusion and adjustment.

Invention is the process by which new forms of technology are created. Inventions are collective contributions to an existing cultural base that cannot occur unless the society has already gained a certain level of knowledge and expertise in the particular area. Accumulation is the growth of technology because new things are invented more rapidly than old ones are forgotten, and some inventions (such as writing) promote this accumulation process. Diffusion is the spread of an idea from one cultural group to another, or from one field of activity to another, and as diffusion brings inventions together, they combine to form new inventions. Adjustment is the process by which the non-technical aspects of a culture respond to invention, and any retardation of this adjustment process causes cultural lag.
