= Andrew Feenberg =

American philosopher (born 1943)

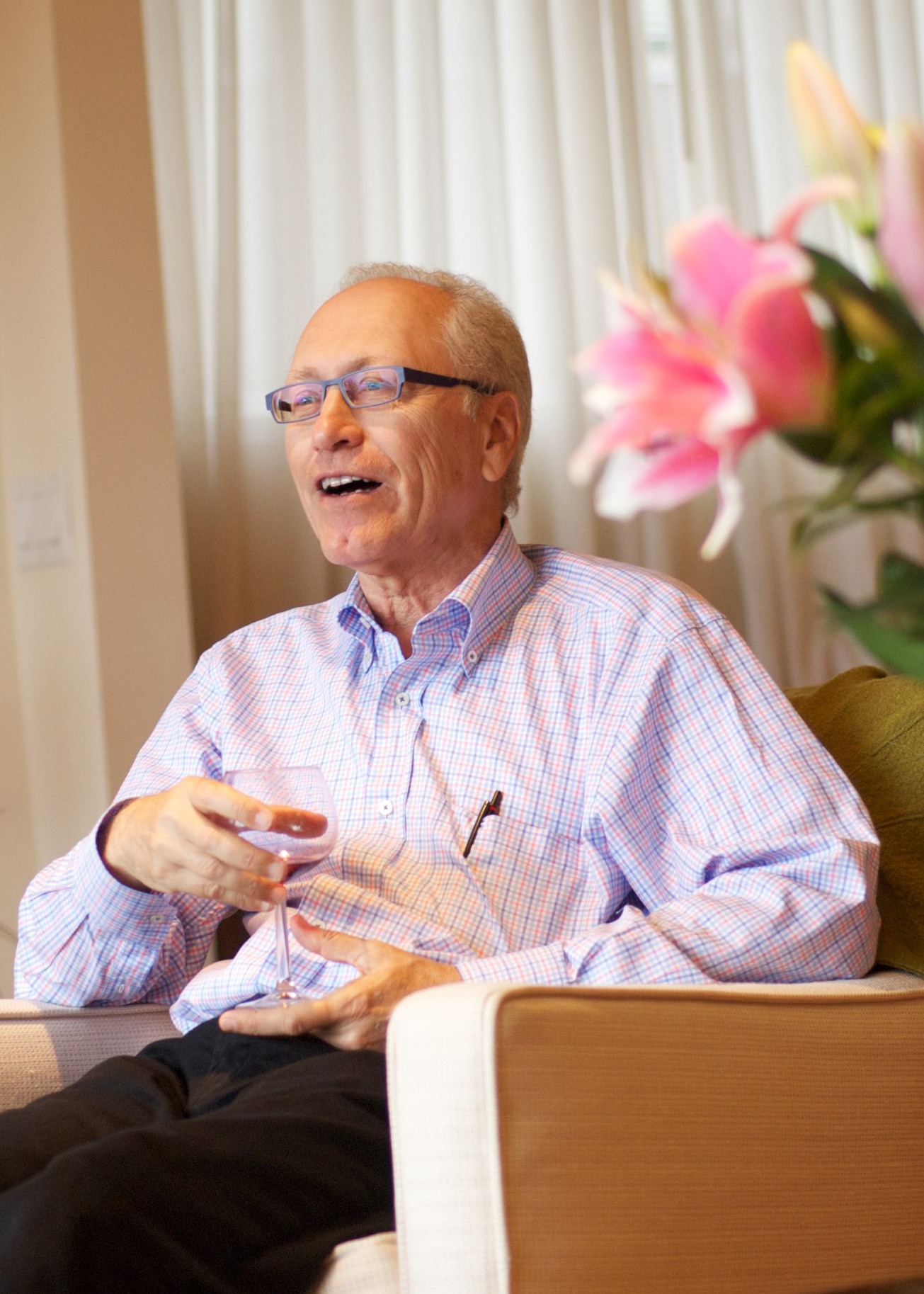
- Feenberg in Vancouver, Canada, 2010
- Born: 1943 (age 82–83)
- Education: University of California, San Diego
- Occupation: Philosopher
- Spouse: Anne-Marie Feenberg

Andrew Feenberg (born 1943) is an American philosopher. He holds the Canada Research Chair in the Philosophy of Technology in the School of Communication at Simon Fraser University in Vancouver. His main interests are philosophy of technology, continental philosophy, critique of technology and science and technology studies.

== Education ==
Feenberg studied philosophy under Herbert Marcuse at the University of California, San Diego and was awarded his PhD in 1972. During this time Feenberg was active in the New Left, founding a journal entitled Alternatives and participating in the May '68 events in Paris.

== Philosophy ==
=== Technology ===
Compared to his predecessors in philosophy of technology, such as Martin Heidegger and Jacques Ellul who have a dystopian view of technology, Feenberg's view is positive even though critical. For Heidegger and Ellul technology affects people's life but is for the most part beyond their control. For Feenberg technology and society influence each other. He separates himself from the instrumentalists who view technology merely as instruments which are within humans' full control.

Feenberg's primary contribution to the philosophy of technology is his argument for the democratic transformation of technology. From his book Transforming Technology,

"What human beings are and will become is decided in the shape of our tools no less than in the action of statesmen and political movements. The design of technology is thus an ontological decision fraught with political consequences. The exclusion of the vast majority from participation in this decision is profoundly undemocratic" (p.3).

Feenberg provides the theoretical foundation for this idea through the Critical Theory of Technology which he develops over three books: The Critical Theory of Technology (1991) (re-published as Transforming Technology: A Critical Theory Revisited [2002]), Alternative Modernity: The Technical Turn in Philosophy and Social Theory (1995), and Questioning Technology (1999). The basis of Feenberg's critical theory of technology is a concept of dialectical technological rationality he terms instrumentalization theory. Instrumentalization theory combines the social critique of technology familiar from the philosophy of technology (Karl Marx, Herbert Marcuse, Martin Heidegger, Jacques Ellul) with insights taken from the empirical case studies of science and technology studies. Applications of his theory include studies of online education, the Minitel, the Internet, and digital games.

=== Democratic rationalization ===
Democratic rationalization is term used by Feenberg in his article "Subversive Rationalization: Technology, Power and Democracy with technology." Feenberg argues against the idea of technological determinism citing flaws in its two fundamental theses. The first is the thesis of unilinear progress. This is the belief that technological progress follows a direct and predictable path from lower to higher levels of complexity and that each stage along this path is necessary for progress to occur.

The second is the thesis of determination by the base. This is the concept that in a society where a technology had been introduced, that society must organize itself or adapt to the technology (Feenberg 211). In his argument against the former thesis Feenberg says that constructivist studies of technology will lead us to realize that there is not a set path by which development of technologies occur but rather an emerging of similar technologies at the same time leading to a multiplicity of choices. These choices are made based upon certain social factors and upon examining them we will see that they are not deterministic in nature.

Arguing against the latter thesis, Feenberg calls to our attention social reforms that have been mandated by governments mainly in regards to the protection of its citizens and laborers. Most of the time these mandates are widely accepted after being passed through the governing body. At which point technology and industry will reform and re-evolve to meet the new standards in a way that has greater efficiency than it did so previously.

=== Other writings ===
Feenberg has also published books and articles on the philosophy of Herbert Marcuse, Martin Heidegger, Jürgen Habermas, Karl Marx, Georg Lukacs, and Kitarō Nishida.

== Selected works ==
=== Books ===
Author

- Lukacs, Marx and the Sources of Critical Theory (Rowman and Littlefield, 1981; Oxford University Press, 1986)
- Critical Theory of Technology (Oxford University Press, 1991), later republished as Transforming Technology (Oxford University Press, 2002), see below.
- Alternative Modernity (University of California Press, 1995)
- Questioning Technology (Routledge, 1999).
- Transforming Technology: A Critical Theory Revisited (Oxford University Press, 2002).
- Heidegger and Marcuse: The Catastrophe and Redemption of History (Routledge 2005).
- Between Reason and Experience: Essays in Technology and Modernity (MIT Press, 2010).
- The Philosophy of Praxis: Marx, Lukács and the Frankfurt School (Verso Press, 2014).
- Technosystem: The Social Life of Reason (Harvard University Press, 2017).
- Nishida, Kawabata, and the Japanese Response to Modernity (Chisokudō Publications, 2019)
- The Ruthless Critique of Everything Existing: Nature and Revolution in Marcuse's Philosophy of Praxis (Verso Press, 2023).

Editor

- w/ R. Pippen & C.Webel, Marcuse: Critical Theory and the Promise of Utopia (Bergin and Garvey Press, 1988)
- w/ A. Hannay, Technology and the Politics of Knowledge (Indiana University Press, 1995)
- w/ T. Misa & P. Brey, Modernity and Technology (MIT Press, 2003)
- w/ D. Barney, Community in the Digital Age (Rowman and Littlefield, 2004).
- w/ W. Leiss, The Essential Marcuse: Selected Writings of Philosopher and Social Critic Herbert Marcuse (Beacon Press, 2007).
