= Clarence Edwin Ayres =

American economist (1891–1972)

Clarence Ayres
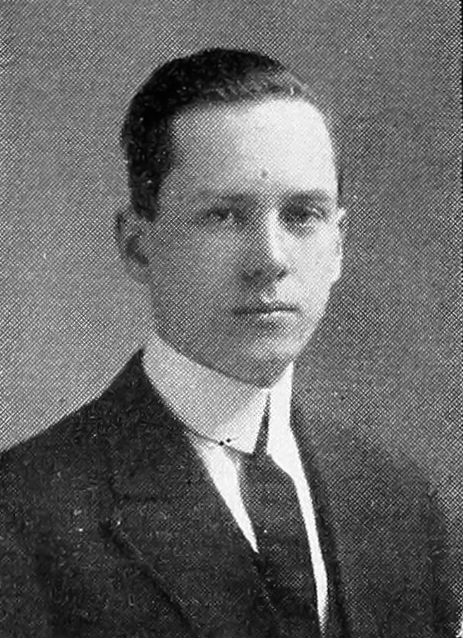
- Born: May 6, 1891; Lowell, Massachusetts
- Died: July 24, 1972 (aged 81); Alamogordo, New Mexico

Academic background
- Influences: Thorstein Veblen; John Dewey

Academic work
- Discipline: Institutional economics
- School or tradition: Institutional economics
- Notable ideas: Development of Veblenian dichotomy

Clarence Edwin Ayres (May 6, 1891 – July 24, 1972) was the principal thinker in the Texas school of institutional economics during the middle of the 20th century.

== Life ==
Ayres was born in Lowell, Massachusetts, the son of a Baptist minister. He graduated from Brown University in 1912, and received a Ph.D. in philosophy from the University of Chicago in 1917. He taught at Chicago from 1917 until 1920, and then moved on to Amherst College, in Massachusetts, where he taught until 1923. Following a year at Reed College in Portland, Oregon, Ayres became associate editor of the New Republic, where he worked until 1927. In that year, Ayres joined the faculty at the University of Texas at Austin, where he remained until his retirement in 1968. One of Ayres students during Ayres time at Amherst College was Talcott Parsons, the most famous of all American sociologists, who wrote two term-papers for Ayres's Philosophy III class. Another notable student of Ayres was C. Wright Mills. Ayres died on July 24, 1972, in Alamogordo, New Mexico.

== Ideas ==
Ayres is best known for developing an economic philosophy stemming from the works of Thorstein Veblen and John Dewey. From Veblen, he took over the notion of the struggle with the so-called capitalist society as a (Darwinist) struggle between technology and ceremonial structure. Veblen had proposed an analytical dichotomy between the "instrumental" and the "ceremonial" aspects of culture. Ayres substituted the term "institutional" for the term "ceremonial" (although he continued to use the term "ceremonial" for some purposes). From Dewey he took over the concept of "instrumentalism," and particularly adopted as his own Dewey's theory of values, which he used to attack the notion of philosophical dualism. Ayres's attack on dualism and "higher values" was the key reason why his student Talcott Parsons rejected his ideas.

== Works ==
- 1917. The Nature of the Relationship between Ethics and Economics. Dissertation, University of Chicago.
- 1927. Science: The False Messiah. Indianapolis: Bobbs-Merrill.
- 1929. Holier Than Thou: The Way of the Righteous. Indianapolis: Bobbs-Merrill
- 1932
- 1938. The Problem of Economic Order. New York: Farrar and Rinehart.
- 1944. The Theory of Economic Progress. Chapel Hill: University of North Carolina Press.
- 1946. The Divine Right of Capital. Boston: Houghton Mifflin.
- 1952. The Industrial Economy: Its Technological Basis and Institutional Destiny. Boston: Houghton Mifflin.
- 1961. Toward a Reasonable Society: The Values of Industrial Civilization. Austin: University of Texas Press.
- 1962. The Theory of Economic Progress, 2nd ed. New York: Schocken Books.
