= Cultural lag =

Theory of culture and technology

The difference between material culture and non-material culture is known as cultural lag. The term cultural lag refers to the notion that culture takes time to catch up with technological innovations, and the resulting social problems that are caused by this lag. In other words, cultural lag occurs whenever there is an unequal rate of change between different parts of culture causing a gap between material and non-material culture. Subsequently, cultural lag does not only apply to this idea only, but also relates to theory and explanation. It helps by identifying and explaining social problems to predict future problems in society. The term was coined in William F. Ogburn's 1922 work Social Change with Respect to Culture and Original Nature.

As explained by James W. Woodward, when the material conditions change, changes are occasioned in the adaptive culture, but these changes in the adaptive culture do not synchronize exactly with the change in the material culture, this delay is the cultural lag. If people fail to adjust to the rapid environmental and technological changes it will cause a lag or a gap between the cultures. This resonates with ideas of technological determinism, which means that technology determines the development of its cultural values and social structure. That is, it can presuppose that technology has independent effects on society at large. However it does not necessarily assign causality to technology. Rather cultural lag focuses examination on the period of adjustment to new technologies. According to sociologists William F. Ogburn, cultural lag is a common societal phenomenon due to the tendency of material culture to evolve and change rapidly and voluminously while non-material culture tends to resist change and remain fixed for a far longer period of time. This is because ideals and values are much harder to change than physical things are. Due to the opposing nature of these two aspects of culture, adaptation of new technology becomes rather difficult. This can cause a disconnect between people and their society or culture. This distinction between material and non-material culture is also a contribution of Ogburn's 1922 work on social change. Ogburn's classic example of cultural lag was the period of adaptation when automobiles became faster and more efficient. It took some time for society to start building infrastructure that would tailor mainly to the new, more efficient, vehicles. This is because people are not comfortable with change and it takes them a little time to adapt. Hence, the term cultural lag.

== Social Change With Respect to Culture and Original Nature (1922) ==
Social Change with Respect to Culture and Original Nature is a 1922 work by Ogburn. This work was crucial in drawing attention to issues with social changes and responses. In this work he coined the term cultural lag to describe a lag between material and non-material cultures. Ogburn states that there is a gap between traditional cultural values and the technical realities in the world. This work was innovative at the time of its release and brought light to the issues of 'cultural lag' and the possible solutions that could fix these issues. This was not the first time these issues have been looked at, but this is the first time that real solutions were presented. Ogburn's theory was not widely accepted at first due to people having different interpretations of the work. In the book he also details the four factors of technical development, which are: invention, accumulation, diffusion, and adjustment. In the work he suggests that primary engine of change and progress is technology, but that it is tempered by social responses. The book had mixed a mixed response because many interpreted his findings in many different ways.

== Works on Cultural Lag ==
=== Social Change With Respect to Culture and Original Nature (1922) ===
==== By: William F. Ogburn ====
In Social Change with Respect to Culture and Original Nature, sociologist William F. Ogburn coins the term 'cultural lag'. Ogburn states his thesis of cultural lag in this work. He says that the source of most modern social change is material culture. His theory of cultural lag suggests that a period of maladjustment occurs when the non-material culture is struggling to adapt to new material conditions. The rapid changes material culture force other parts of culture to change, but the rate of change in these other parts of culture is much slower. He states that people live in a state of 'maladjustment' because of this. Ogburn makes claims that he played a considerable role in solving the issue of social evolution. He goes on to say that the fours solving factors of social evolution are: invention, exponential accumulation, diffusion, and adjustment. This work was unique and innovative at the time of its publication.

=== On Culture and Change (1964) ===
==== By: William F. Ogburn ====
On Culture and Change is a work by William F. Ogburn which is a collection of 25 works from the years 1912–1961. It is an examination of social change and culture from the perspective of a sociologist. The 25 topics discussed in the work are separated into four topics: social evolution, social trends, short-run changes, and the subjective in the social sciences. This collection of works examines culture and social change in the world. The findings and information in On Culture and Change continues to be influential and useful to this day.

=== Future Shock (1970) ===
==== By: Alvin Toffler ====
In Future Shock, Alvin Toffler outlines the shattering stress and disorientation that rapid change people feel when they are subjected to too much change in too short of a time. Toffler says that society is undergoing a transformation from an industrial society to a "super-industrial" society. He states that this accelerating rate of change is causing people to feel disconnected from the culture. Toffler argues that balance is needed between the accelerated rates of change in society and the limited pace of human response. Toffler says that it is not impossible to attempt to slow or even control the rapid change and that it is possible for the future to arrive before society is ready for it. Toffler says that the only way to keep equilibrium would be to create social and new personal regulators. Strategies need to be put in place so that rapid culture change can be shaped and controlled.

=== Cultural Lag: Conception & Theory (1997) ===
==== By: Richard L. Brinkman, June E. Brinkman ====
In Cultural Lag: Conception & Theory, Richard & June Brinkman go into what the theory and concept of cultural lag actually is. They go into detail about the points supporting and the points disputing the concept of cultural lag. They evaluate Ogburn's claims about cultural lag and make them more understandable. The work evaluates the existence of cultural lag and its ability to possibly predict and describe cultural change in society. The work also goes into the relevance of the concept of cultural lag to socioeconomic policies in the world.

== Criticism ==
The cultural lag thesis suffers from ambiguity and insufficient details, where "lag" is applied to categories that are incomparable and to time-gaps that cannot be measured. For Heather Osborne, this constitutes cultural lag's fundamental failure as a social scientific theory, whose refutation must be possible with evidence according to Popperian philosophy of science. Critics disagree on whether the theory could be salvaged (i.e., the existence of a "true lag") or whether cultural lag exists at all. Alternatively, Langdon Winner recognized the cultural lag is significant as a discourse, regardless of its empirical inaccuracy, and analyzed the function of cultural lag in political thought and technology studies.

Critics believe that the insufficiency and success of cultural lag is a result of shared cultural biases between readers, who share assumptions about what culture is and how it is experienced. However, the example of industrialization and the "lagging" family demonstrates that cultures are not homogeneous because families (e.g., rural and urban) and family members (e.g., housewives, working husbands) have different experiences and assumptions. Cultural integration is not total guaranteed either. These uncritical assumptions led sociologists like C. Wright Mills to suggest that the cultural lag thesis disguises values as descriptions and theory, saying "Judgments are thus disguised as statements about a time sequence. ... it tells [people] what changes are 'called for' and what changes 'ought' to have come about but have not. It tells them where they have made progress and where they have not done so well."

Furthermore, cultural lag theory rests on several disputed claims in sociology. First, the theory assumes that culture can be divided into material and non-material components, when non-material special interests often cause changes to technologies and material conditions. Second, the theory assumes that technology is the definitive cause of social progress. Last, the theory assumes that the "lag" (1) can be elimintaed, (2) should be eliminated, and (3) and will result in largely positive outcomes.

== Material and non-material culture ==
Material and non-material culture both are a big part of the theory of cultural lag. The theory states that material culture evolves and changes much quicker than non-material culture. Material culture being physical things, such as technology & infrastructure, and non-material culture being non-physical things, such as religion, ideals, and rules. Non-material culture lags behind material culture because the pace of human response is much slower than the pace of material change. New inventions and physical things that make people's lives easier are developed every single day, things such as religions and ideals are not. This is why there is cultural lag, if there is an invention created that goes against people's ideals it will take some time in order for them to accept the new invention and use it.

=== Material culture ===
Material culture is a term used by sociologists that refers to all physical objects that humans create that give meaning or define a culture. These are physical things that can be touched, felt, tasted, or observed with a sense. The term can include things like houses, churches, machines, furniture, or anything else for which a person may have some sentiment. The term can also include some things that cannot be seen but can be used. Things like the internet and television are also covered under the material culture definition. Material culture changes rapidly and changes depending where in the world somebody is. The environment may present different challenges in different parts of the world that is why material culture is so different everywhere. For example, houses in the heart of Tokyo are going to be smaller than the houses in Austin, Texas.

=== Non-material culture ===
Non-material culture is a term used by sociologists that refers to non-physical things such as ideas, values, beliefs, and rules that shape a culture. There are different belief systems everywhere in the world, different religions, myths, and legends that people may believe in. These non-physical things can be information passed down from past generations or new ideas thought up by somebody in today's world. Non-Material culture tends to lag behind material culture because it is easier to create a physical object that people will use than it is to create a system of beliefs or ideals that people will use and follow. Non-material culture tends to be very different wherever in the world someone is. This is because people from different backgrounds and areas in the world were raised on different ideals and beliefs that help shape society and culture.

== Cases by country ==
=== South Korea ===
South Korea is a country with a serious cultural lag. Before South Korea's rapid growth, South Korea went through various turmoils in the late Joseon Dynasty, the Japanese colonial period, the Korean War. South Korea achieved rapid growth while its land was in ruins. Since South Korea achieved its current level through rapid growth from a place with nothing but human resources, South Korea's cultural lag has become serious. Also, the military dictatorship that lasted until the 1980s further accelerated South Korea's cultural lag. In particular, anachronistic perceptions based on Confucian culture account for most of the cultural lag.

==== LGBTQ rights issues ====
Compared to Japan and Taiwan, the LGBTQ rights situation is worse. In Japan, support for legalising same-sex marriage reached 70% as of 2023, and in Taiwan, same-sex marriage has already been legalised. However, as of 2025, public opinion in South Korea supporting same-sex marriage is only 34%.

==== Sexual solemnity ====
Criticism is being raised that South Korea's sex education is inadequate due to the atmosphere of sexual solemnity in South Korean society.

== Implications of cultural lag ==
Cultural lag creates problems for a society in a multitude of ways. The issue of cultural lag tends to permeate any discussion in which the implementation of some new technology is a topic.

For example, the advent of stem cell research has given rise to many new, potentially beneficial medical technologies; however these new technologies have also raised serious ethical questions about the use of stem cells in medicine. In this example, the cultural lag is the fear of people to use a new possibly beneficial medical practices because of ethical issues.

Issues can also arise when an aspect of culture changes so rapidly that society is unable to prepare or adjust to it. This is seen in the example of cars overtaking other modes of transportation in the past. Broader roads, traffic rules, and separate lanes for horses did not come until some time after automobiles became a part of the mainstream culture. This caused dangerous situations for pedestrians and the people driving these new automobiles.

== See also ==
- Behavioural change theories
- Disruptive innovation
- I-Change Model
- Pace of innovation
- Progress trap
- Transtheoretical model
- Value network
