= Daniel Chandler =

British visual semiotician

Academic background
- Education: Magdalene College, Cambridge
- Thesis: The Experience of Writing: A Media Theory Approach (1993)

Academic work
- Discipline: Philosophy
- Sub-discipline: semiotics
- Institutions: Aberystwyth University
- Notable works: Semiotics: The Basics; Oxford Dictionary of Media and Communication

Daniel Chandler (born 1952) is a British visual semiotician based since 2001 at the Department of Theatre, Film and Television Studies at Aberystwyth University, where he has taught since 1989. His best-known publication is Semiotics: The Basics (Routledge: 1st edn 2002, 2nd edn 2007), which is frequently used as a basis for university courses in semiotics, and the online version Semiotics for Beginners (online since 1995). He has a particular interest in the visual semiotics of gender and advertising.

== Early career ==
Chandler trained as a schoolteacher at Magdalene College, Cambridge, and began his career teaching English in middle and secondary schools in the 1970s and 1980s. He adopted a progressive, constructivist philosophy of education at a time when microcomputers were first introduced into the classroom. Resisting the hyped image of computing in education as a boon to instructional productivity, Chandler recognized the computer as a tool for learning, but he rejected a prevailing objectivism that considered data as information, and information as knowledge. He held a constructivist view that data is translated into information by human beings, not computers, and humans negotiate the meaning of information by means of dialog and discussion (Chandler, 1990a). The computer, for Chandler, was not a teaching machine, but a medium of expression for young learners. His early adoption of computers in the classroom led to the publication of several authored and edited texts related to computing in education. He left teaching in 1981 and set up an independent consultancy, notably serving as a design consultant for Acornsoft on the development of educational software for use by the BBC. In 1989, Chandler returned to academia, joining the Education Department at Aberystwyth University. His initial role as a lecturer in educational technology soon changed to that of a lecturer in media theory, and in 2001 he moved to the Department of Theatre, Film, and Television Studies as a lecturer in media and communication studies.

Chandler's 1993 dissertation on The Experience of Writing focused on the phenomenology of writing. That work led to the 1995 text, The Act of Writing which he posted freely on the World Wide Web. Where the tendency of most authors had been to withhold their work from online access for various reasons, Chandler was never so inhibited. Self publishing The Act of Writing was one of several experiments that he launched in an exploration of the Web's possibilities as a medium for teaching. In 1994, he began placing lecture materials online for use by his own students. This practice of open access proved successful and rewarding. As the richness of this material evolved in the ensuing months, and as the population of Internet users exploded in the mid-1990s, Chandler's site quickly attracted an international audience of students, scholars and mediaphiles hungry for rewarding academic content. The MCS Web offered tangible content that went beyond the typical outlines, bibliographies and promotional material hosted on most academic and commercial sites of the time. The Media and Communications Studies site established itself as a premier online academic resource for theoretical and educational material in the fields of rhetoric, communication studies, semiotics, media and contemporary philosophy.

In 2011, Chandler and Rod Munday published the Oxford Dictionary of Media and Communication.

== The study of semiotics ==
As a lecturer in media studies at Aberystwyth, Chandler prepared a series of materials on semiotics, written in a language and style that would be comprehensible to his own undergraduate students. He noted with irritation that his personal introduction to the field "had been frustrated by many of the existing books on the subject that frequently seemed impossible to understand".( p.xv). He placed these lectures on the internet to augment the other media and communication studies materials that he had prepared for his students. Over time, this set of lectures took the form of an online book, Semiotics for Beginners. The text attracted the attention of numerous other lecturers in search of materials to augment their own lectures. Chandler credits the philosopher A. C. Grayling with encouraging him to submit his online work for print publication. The first edition of Semiotics: the Basics was published by Routledge in 2002. By 2005, the book had become one of the best-known introductory texts in the field of semiotics. Routledge released a second edition in 2007. (See reviews by Juan A. Prieto-Pablos (2005), and Edward McDonald (2003).)

== Critique of Technological Determinism ==
In “Technological or Media Determinism” (1995), Chandler outlines his five fundamental disagreements with the theory of Technological determinism:

Reductionistic: Technological Determinism assumes that the complex process of historical change is caused solely by technology. Ex: “Social media makes people depressed"

Mechanistic: The assumption that technology causes change in casual predictable ways and that it causes the same change in all people who use it. Ex: “The higher the usage of social media the more reliant on it one becomes”

Reifying: Technological Determinism views abstractions (e.g., “the Internet”) and inanimate objects (e.g., tech devices) as if they were scientist entities with intentions, wants, and needs. Ex: “My phone is mad at me”

Technological autonomy: The belief that technology is self-generating, rather than invented, implemented or regulated by human beings. The idea that because a technology has been created, that there is an autonomous self-evolution of that technology. Ex: “Cell phones gave rise to smartphones”

Technological Imperative: The assumption that because we have developed a technology we must inherently use it, or will use it whether people prefer to or not. Ex: Although social media has negative effects on us we still use it because it’s there.

== Bibliography ==
- Chandler, Daniel (ed) (1983) Exploring English with Microcomputers. London: Council for Educational Technology
- Chandler, Daniel (1984) Young Learners and the Microcomputer. Milton Keynes: Open University Press
- Chandler, Daniel and Marcus, Stephen (eds) (1985) Computers and Literacy. Milton Keynes: Open University Press
- Chandler, Daniel (1994) "Who needs suspended inscription?", Computers and Composition 11(3): 191-201
- Chandler, Daniel (1995a) The Act of Writing: A Media Theory Approach. Aberystwyth: Prifysgol Cymru. ISBN 978-0-903878-44-9
- Chandler, Daniel (1995b) "Notes on the Gaze"
- Chandler, Daniel (1995c) "Technological or Media Determinism"
- Chandler, Daniel (1997a) "An Introduction to Genre Theory"
- Chandler, Daniel (2002/2007) Semiotics: The Basics, Routledge, London, UK, 1st edn 2002. ISBN 0-415-36375-6; 2nd edn 2007 ISBN 978-0-415-36375-4
- Chandler, Daniel and Munday, Rod (2011) A Dictionary of Media and Communication. Oxford: Oxford University Press
