= Lumea Nouă =

Archaeological site in Romania

Lumea Nouă is a middle Neolithic to Chalcolithic (possibly Early Bronze Age) archaeological site in Alba Iulia, Romania. The site is named after the Lumea Nouă district of the city. The site was first researched (and likely discovered) by Ion Berciu in the 1940s. It has been excavated by several researchers since then, most recently Mihai Gligor of the 1 Decembrie 1918 University, Alba Iulia. Cultures present at this site include Vinča (B and C), Foieni, Petrești and Coțofeni.

17 disarticulated human skeletal remains have been found at Lumea Nouă - 13 adults and 4 sub-adults.

== See also ==
- Prehistory of Transylvania
