= Social determinism =

Theory of human behavior

Social determinism is the theory that social interactions alone determine individual behavior (as opposed to biological or objective factors).

A social determinist would only consider social dynamics like customs, cultural expectations, education, and interpersonal interactions as the contributing factors to shape human behavior. Non-social influences, like biology, would be ignored in their contribution towards behavior. Thus, in line with the nature-nurture debate, social determinism is analogous to the 'nurture' side of the argument.

== Overview ==
Social determinism was studied by the French philosopher Émile Durkheim (1858–1917), who was considered the father of social science. Social determinism is most commonly understood in opposition to biological determinism.

However, within the media studies discipline, social determinism is understood as the counterpart of technological determinism. Technological determinism is the notion that technological change and development are inevitable and that the characteristics of any given technology determine how it is used by the society in which it is developed. The concept of technological determinism is dependent on the premise that social changes come about as a result of the new capabilities that new technologies enable.

== Technological determinism ==
Social determinism perceives technology as a result of the society in which it is developed. A number of contemporary media theorists have provided persuasive accounts of social determinism, including Lelia Green (2001).

In her book Technoculture, Green examines in detail the workings of a social determinist perspective, and argues "social processes determine technology for social purposes." She claims that every technological development throughout history was born of a social need, be this need economical, political or military.

According to Green (2001), technology is always developed with a particular purpose or objective in mind. As the development of technology is necessarily facilitated by financial funding, a social determinist perspective recognizes that technology is always developed to benefit those who are capable of funding its development.

Thus, social determinists perceive that technological development is not only determined by the society in which it occurs, but that it is inevitably shaped by the power structures that exist in that society.

== Background ==
Social determinism branches off the overarching concept of determinism, which is the notion that pre-existing causes determine all events, circumstances, or behaviors.

Determinism proposes that all behavior has either an external or internal cause.

== Theories and concepts ==
Listed below are some theories and concepts that relate to the perspective of social determinism. As psychology is a constantly developing field, this is not a definitive list but includes significant studies and ideas.

=== Behaviorism ===
Social determinism aligns with the concept of behaviorism, which is the study of observable human behavior. Behaviorists believe that an individual's behavior can be explained by the response to the environment around them. Classical conditioning and operant conditioning provide an example of socially deterministic factors on behavior. These processes of conditioning provide evidence to suggest that behavior is learned and associated with consequences from the environment. Conditioning has been argued to be deterministic, as there is a lack of free will in the response of learning.

Social determinism aligns with the theory of behaviorism and conditioning, due to the social influences and environmental factors that determine a person's behavior.

=== Obedience ===
The concept of compliance and following orders relates to social determinism, as it follows the idea that individuals follow orders based on environmental and social variables.

This relates to the concept of social influence determining behavior, as demonstrated from the Milgram Experiment conducted in 1963. This study looked at environmental stimuli and social pressure on the responses of participants, namely whether they would inflict harm on another person.

The results from this study showed that participants were more or less likely to follow orders based on the perceived authority and prestige of the experimenter.

Milgram's study was replicated in the 21st century, with similar findings developed, suggesting the conclusions withstand the test of time. These studies into destructive obedience are prime example of how individuals are predetermined by their social environment, causing them to behave in certain ways which they may not have under different circumstances.

=== Sociocultural theory of cognitive development ===
The sociocultural theory emphasises how social contexts and interactions can determine children's behavior. Lev Vygotsky developed this theory prior to his death in 1934; his manuscripts and essays were translated and published posthumously, allowing the theory to be developed.

Vygotsky explores how inputs from an individual's society, culture and interactions contribute to development, demonstrating the socially deterministic aspects in advancing mental abilities. His essays are compiled in his book, Mind in Society, which focuses on the effect of cultural and parental interaction on child development.

Examples of the theory in practice can be seen cross-culturally, looking at the life-cycle of human development, with changes in development dependent on their context. Children of war, poverty and famine are likely to have lower cognitive abilities and mental illnesses like PTSD and anxiety. This can be owed to the trauma from their environments and distress from exposure to stressful social contexts. This reinforces the concept that their mental health, behavioural responses and abilities are determined by the societal interactions and environment.

=== Social learning theory ===
The social learning theory provides a model which accounts for the range of learning experiences that occur during child development and interaction. This theory was proposed by Albert Bandura in 1977. The theory is behavioral and cognitive in nature, suggesting that learning is a cognitive process that occurs based on the social context, with reinforcement and modelling playing a key role.

Bandura provided evidence to suggest that a child's development and behavior is determined by the social interactions they have in their lives. Bandura illustrated this concept through observational learning, demonstrated in his 1961 Bobo doll experiment. This experiment looked at imitation, namely looking at whether children copied the behaviour of an adult. In this context, it was aggressive physical and verbal behaviour. Through the experiment and further research, Bandura outlined the contribution of modelling and social behavior in determining children's behavior, providing evidence for the concept of social determinism.

== Cross-cultural studies ==
Cross-cultural studies demonstrate how cultural variation can significantly impact an individual's inherent beliefs and behavior. Considering the results of cross-cultural psychological studies, the social context has a significant impact on a person's behavior and responses. This is notable when considering socialization and attitudes towards mental health and crises.

This section looks at a limited number of human behavioral responses and interactions, and how the context plays a key part in the individuality of response.

=== Helping behaviour ===
Levine et al.'s 2001 study was conducted in 23 large, global cities. The study looked at the likelihood of individuals from different cultures on helping in non-emergency situations. The results indicated that altruistic behaviour varied depending on the society that an individual was a part of. This variation was owed to the factors such as the normality of amiable social behavior (simpatia), economic productivity, socialization and cultural traditions.

Levine's study supports the concept of social determinism, as it suggests that helping behavior is primarily influenced by socialization and cultural determinants.

=== Well-being ===
Across different cultures, the population have varied opinions on the 'ideal' level of subjective well-being. Evidence has shown that it is important to consider individual perspectives when rating happiness and well-being. Attempts to identify a universal indicator for subjective well-being has been unsuccessful, due to the significant variation in cultural contexts.

Social interactions and context play heavily into individual desires to express certain emotions; for example, studies have shown that East Asians tend to have lower levels of well-being, and emotions that are considered 'positive' and desired differ. For example, European Americans enjoy feeling high-energy emotions, like excitement, whilst individuals from Hong Kong prefer calmer states. Similarly, the nature of a society being individualist or collectivist can play a part in ideals of well-being. Studies have suggested that individuals within collectivist societies have lower life satisfaction due to stringent cultural norms and amplified societal pressure.

Well-being is a good example of social determination. It demonstrates that an individual's perspectives on what constitutes as being satisfied and well is dependent on socialization and cultural context.

=== Conflict resolution ===
Cultural and social practices play a critical role in the way individuals handle conflict. It appears that societal aspects, like collectivism, can explain differences in approaches to dealing with conflicts. A quasi-experimental study found that Mexicans use negotiating techniques far more than their US counterparts when dealing with conflict, a finding owed to the collectivist nature of society and social cues.

== Ideology ==
The creation of an ideology within the society of the individual can cause an individual's actions and reactions to stimuli to become predetermined to adhere to the social rules imposed on them.

Ideologies can be created using social institutions such as schooling, which "have become the terrain upon which contending forces express their social and political interest," or the mass media, which has "significant power in shaping the social agenda and framing of public opinion to support that agenda."

Social determinism can favor a political party's agenda by setting social rules so that the individual considers the party's agenda to be morally correct, an example being the 2010 G20 summit riots in Toronto. An individual's view on the subject was influenced by the media and their reactions are predetermined by that social form of control. "We have been taught to think that censorship is the main mechanism of how the media uses information as a form of social control, but in fact what is said, and how it is selectively presented, is a far more powerful form of information control."

== Arguments against social determinism ==
=== Biology ===
The arguments that are against social determinism largely fall under biological determinism, which aligns closely with the 'nature' side of the nature vs nurture debate.

==== Social pre-wiring hypothesis ====
Scientific studies have shown that social behavior is partly inherited and can influence infants and also even influence foetuses. "Wired to be social" means that infants are not taught that they are social beings, but they are born with inherited social skills.

Social pre-wiring refers to the ontogeny of social interaction, which is informally referred to as, "wired to be social." This concept deals with the study of fetal social behavior and social interactions in a multi-fetal environment. Specifically, the theory questions whether there is a propensity to socially oriented action already present before birth. Research in the theory concludes that newborns are born into the world with a unique genetic wiring to be social.

Circumstantial evidence supporting the social pre-wiring hypothesis can be revealed when examining newborns' behavior. Newborns, not even hours after birth, have been found to display a preparedness for social interaction. This preparedness is expressed in ways such as their imitation of facial gestures. This observed behavior cannot be contributed to any current form of socialization. Rather, newborns most likely inherit to some extent social behavior and identity through genetics.

Principal evidence of this theory is uncovered by examining twin pregnancies. The main argument is, if there are social behaviors that are inherited and developed before birth, then one should expect twin foetuses to engage in some form of social interaction before they are born. Thus, ten foetuses were analyzed over a period of time using ultrasound techniques. Using kinematic analysis, the results of the experiment were that the twin foetuses would interact with each other for longer periods and more often as the pregnancies went on. Researchers were able to conclude that the performance of movements between the co-twins were not accidental but specifically aimed.

The social pre-wiring hypothesis was proved correct, "The central advance of this study is the demonstration that 'social actions' are already performed in the second trimester of gestation. Starting from the 14th week of gestation twin foetuses plan and execute movements specifically aimed at the co-twin. These findings force us to predate the emergence of social behavior: when the context enables it, as in the case of twin foetuses, other-directed actions are not only possible but predominant over self-directed actions." This suggests that there are inherent, biological factors which are responsible for factors like social behaviour, which disputes the argument of social determinism.

==== Traumatic brain injuries ====
Findings from head-injury studies suggest that some aspects of behavior can change after a traumatic brain injury. Significant brain damage is associated with poorer decision making, reduced regulation ability and changes in personality.

The 1848 case of Phineas Gage is the first recorded case study into the localisation of brain function, providing evidence to show that personality and behaviour is determined by brain structure. After a large rod was driven through his head, destroying most of his left frontal lobe, his personality shifted to become significantly more hostile and aggressive. Accounts from his doctor, family and friends claimed after the accident his personality and behaviors changed so radically that he was "no longer Gage".

Researchers have argued this provides evidence for the nature side of the debate on behaviour, as evidence has shown that it was the physical trauma that caused the shift in Gage's social interactions and perspectives. This is reinforced by research into brain tumors and contemporary studies into brain injuries. The location of a tumor can have a significant impact on personality and cognitive abilities, suggesting that behavior and socialization is not solely owed to social aspects.

Neuroscientific evidence into brain localisation and function suggests that once the integrity of the brain is disturbed, there are far-reaching consequences with changes in personality, emotions and behaviour usually experienced.

== See also ==
- Determinism – Philosophical view that events are determined by prior events
- Linguistic determinism – Idea of language as the principal framework in dictating human thought
- Enculturation – Process of acquiring values from a neighboring culture
- Tabula rasa – Idea of being born empty of mental content
- Social learning theory – Theory of learning and behaviour
- Externalism – Group of positions in the philosophy of mind
