= Friendster =

Social networking service

- Website type: Social networking service
- Founded: March 22, 2002; 24 years ago (first incarnation); October 2023; 3 years ago (second incarnation)
- Dissolved: 2015; 11 years ago (first incarnation)
- Headquarters: Dover, Delaware, United States
- Area served: Worldwide
- Founder: Jonathan Abrams
- Key people: Mike Carson (CEO)
- Parent: Friendster Labs, Inc. (2003–2009; 2023–present); MOL Global (2009–2015)
- Website: friendster.com
- Advertising: Banner ads, contextual ads, sponsorships
- Registration: Free
- Users: 8.2 million (June 2010)
- Launched: March 2003; 23 years ago (first incarnation); April 2026; 7 months ago (second incarnation)
- Current status: Active
- Native clients on: iOS; Android; Web

Friendster is a social networking service originally based in Mountain View, California, founded by Jonathan Abrams and launched in March 2002. Before Friendster was redesigned, the service allowed users to contact other members, maintain those contacts, and share online content and media with those contacts. The website was also used for dating and discovering new events, bands, and hobbies. Users could share videos, photos, messages, and comments with other members via profiles and networks. It is considered one of the original social networking services.

After the launching of Friendster as a social gaming platform in June 2011, the number of registered users reached over 115 million. The company operated mainly from four countries in Southeast Asia: the Philippines, Malaysia, Thailand, and Singapore, and over 90% of the site's traffic came from Asia. As of 2008, Friendster had more monthly unique visitors than any other social network in Asia. Friendster remained notably popular in Indonesia through 2012.

The company suspended services in 2015, citing "the evolving landscape in our challenging industry" and lack of engagement by the online community, and ceased trading in 2018. Friendster acquired the domain in October 2023. It was relaunched in April 2026.

== History ==
Friendster was founded by Canadian computer programmer Jonathan Abrams on March 22, 2002, and launched in March 2003, before MySpace (August 2003), Hi5 (June 2003), Facebook (February 2004), and other social networking sites. Friendster.com went live in March 2003 and was adopted by 3 million users by autumn of that year.

Friendster was one of the first of these sites to attain over 1 million members, although it was preceded by several other smaller social networking sites such as SixDegrees.com (1997) and Makeoutclub.com (1999).

The name Friendster is a portmanteau of "friend" and Napster. Napster had been a controversial peer-to-peer mp3 audio file sharing Internet service that ran from June 1999 to July 2001; by 2000, "Napster" was practically a household name, thanks to several high-profile lawsuits filed against it that year. The original Friendster site was founded in Mountain View, California, and was privately owned. Friendster was based on the "Circle of Friends" social network technique for networking individuals in virtual communities and demonstrates the small world phenomenon. Friendster was considered the top online social network service until around April 2004, when it was overtaken by MySpace in terms of page views, according to Nielsen//NetRatings.

Publications including Time, Esquire, Vanity Fair, Entertainment Weekly, Us Weekly, and Spin wrote about Friendster's success, and the founder appeared on magazine covers and late-night talk shows. Friendster's rapid success inspired a generation of niche social networking websites, including Dogster and Elfster.

Friendster had also received competition from all-in-one sites such as Windows Live Spaces, Yahoo! 360, and Facebook. Google offered $30 million to buy out Friendster in 2003, but the offer was turned down. Friendster was then funded by Kleiner, Perkins, Caufield & Byers and Benchmark Capital in October 2003 with a reported valuation of $53 million. Friendster's decision to stay private instead of selling to Google in 2003 is considered one of the biggest blunders in Silicon Valley, the Associated Press claims. In April 2004, John Abrams was removed as CEO, and Tim Koogle took over as interim CEO. Koogle previously served as president and CEO at Yahoo!. Scott Sassa later replaced Koogle in June 2004. Sassa left in May 2005 and was replaced by Taek Kwon. Taek Kwon was then succeeded by Kent Lindstrom, following a capitalization by Kleiner and Benchmark that valued Friendster at less than 5% of its 2003 valuation.

In 2008, Friendster had a membership base of more than 115 million registered users and continued to grow in Asia. According to Alexa, the site suffered a drastic decline in traffic in America beginning in 2009. From a peak 40, it dropped to position 800 in November 2010. Most people have since attributed this decline to the rise of Facebook, a rival social networking site. In August 2008, Friendster hired ex-Google executive Richard Kimber as CEO. Kimber focused on Friendster's expansion in Asia.

On December 9, 2009, it was announced that Friendster had been acquired for $26.4 million by an internet company based in Kuala Lumpur, Malaysia named MOL Global. MOL's ownership of Friendster patents including one for a "System, method, and apparatus for connecting users in an online computer system based on their relationships within social networks" and Friendster's other core technical infrastructure patents, were bought by Facebook for $40 million in 2010.

In June 2011, the company re-positioned itself as a social gaming site. It discontinued user social network accounts, but Friendster accounts had not been deleted, and users could still log in using their existing passwords. Users' contact lists were preserved, along with basic information. Friendster said that the focus would now be on pure "entertainment and fun", and the aim was not to compete with Facebook, but rather to complement it.

On June 14, 2015, the site and all its services shut down indefinitely, but the company did not officially shutter until the end of June 2018.

In October 2023, the Friendster domain was acquired by Friendster Labs Inc., and the platform officially first relaunched as an iOS application in April 2026, followed by Android in June 2026 and a web version in August 2026. This new version is a private, ad-free mobile app focused on in-person connections and does not have any legal or technical affiliation with the original social networking service. The current owners have stated that they have no access to data, photos, or accounts from the original 2000s-era platform.

=== Financial history ===
The company was founded in 2002 with a $12 million investment by Kleiner Perkins Caufield & Byers, Benchmark Capital, and private investors.

In 2003, Friendster management received a $30 million buyout offer from Google, which it declined.

Friendster received another $3 million in funding in February 2006 from Kleiner Perkins Caufield & Byers and Benchmark Capital. In August 2006, Friendster also received $10 million in funding in a round led by DAG Ventures, and Friendster announced in August 2008 that it had raised an additional $20 million in funding in a round led by IDG Ventures. Prior to its acquisition by MOL Global, Friendster was backed by Kleiner Perkins Caufield & Byers, Benchmark Capital, DAG Ventures, IDG Ventures, and individual investors.

== Awards and recognitions ==
- In July 2006, Friendster was awarded Key Social Networking Technology Patent.
- In 2007, Friendster was selected by AlwaysOn Media as Top 100 Private Company Award Winner.
- In April 2008, Friendster became a Webware 100 winner.
- In 2009, the site was the subject of a satirical portrayal by The Onion News Network of the site's discovery as an archaeological relic, untouched since 2005.

== Services ==
In November 2009, Friendster announced a global partnership with MOL AccessPortal Berhad (MOL), a leading payments provider leveraging a network of over 600,000 physical and virtual payment channels worldwide, to power the Friendster Wallet and a payments platform enabling micro-spending for over 115 million registered users on Friendster. The Friendster Wallet was designed to support a variety of payment methods including pre-paid cards, mobile payments, online payments and credit card payments.

Friendster also had content partners, including game developers and publishers who provided monetization solutions on the Friendster platform using MOL's payment channels and Friendster's large user base. Sub-brands of Friendster included "Friendster iCafe", a cybercafe management system, and "Friendster Hotspots", a free Wi-Fi infrastructure for retailers.

== Languages ==
Available languages include English, Filipino, Thai, Malay, Vietnamese, Indonesian, Chinese (both Traditional and Simplified), Japanese, Korean, and Spanish. Users can also enter content on Friendster in any language.

Friendster launched all language support on a single domain – www.friendster.com. Friendster was the first global online social network to support Asian languages and others on a single domain so that users from around the world were able to talk to each other.

== Development ==
Friendster had been an open site since August 2006 when it first began allowing widgets and content to be embedded in user profile pages through its developer program. In 2007, roughly 40% of Friendster's users had widgets on their profiles.

Friendster gave software developers access to APIs that utilized content and data within the Friendster network to build and deploy customizable applications on and off Friendster. Friendster's Developer Program was an open, non-proprietary platform with an open revenue model.

Friendster was the first social network to support both the OpenSocial and the Facebook Platform.

In December 2009, Friendster relaunched its website with a new interface.

== Patents ==
Friendster held some fundamental online social networking patents:

- A system, method and apparatus for connecting users in an online computer
- Method of Inducing Content Uploads in a Social Network
- System and Method for Managing Connections in an Online Social Network
- Compatibility Scoring of Users in a Social Network
- Method for sharing relationship information stored in a social network

In August 2010, Facebook confirmed that it had acquired all patents from Friendster for a reported $40M, effectively rendering the company an arms length subsidiary of Facebook.

== Site transformation ==
In June 2011, Friendster shifted from social networking site to a social entertainment site with a focus on gaming and entertainment. Previous users' accounts were unchanged. However, the photos, messages, comments, testimonials, shoutouts, blogs, forums and groups that the users may have had in the past may have no longer been part of their Friendster account. An exporting tool was provided to back up the information of the user account.

The deadline given to users to export their photos was extended to June 27, 2011. Photos which were not exported before the deadline were removed.

In the two months after the new Friendster relaunched, the site attracted more than half a million new users and included over 40 games. Daily and monthly active users increased by 50%, with more than 90% of new users coming from Asia. At the end of 2015 Friendster closed the website and related services, and on July 1, 2018, it officially ceased to exist as a company.
