= Silver–cadmium battery =

Type of rechargeable battery

A silver–cadmium battery is a type of rechargeable battery using cadmium metal as its negative terminal, silver oxide as the positive terminal, and an alkaline water-based electrolyte. It produces about 1.1 volts per cell on discharge, and about 40 watthours per kilogram specific energy density. A silver–cadmium battery provides more energy than a nickel–cadmium cell of comparable weight. It has higher life cycle expectancy than silver–zinc cells, but lower terminal voltage and lower energy density. However, the high cost of silver and the toxicity of cadmium restrict its applications.

The first silver–cadmium batteries were developed by Waldemar Jungner around 1900, who used them in a demonstration electric car and whose company commercially manufactured the cells. These original cells suffered from short life, and it was not until 1941 that an improved separator material was developed to prevent migration of the silver oxide within the cell. Renewed commercial development occurred during the 1950s, to take advantage of the better cycle life of the silver–cadmium system compared to silver-zinc. Like other silver-oxide battery systems, silver–cadmium batteries have relatively flat voltage during discharge. However, high-rate performance is not as good as for silver-zinc batteries. To preserve the operating life of cells, they may be shipped "dry" and the end-user adds electrolyte just before use.

The positive electrode is made of sintered silver powder pasted onto a silver grid as current collector; the silver oxide may be formed in a separate process or may be formed on first charging of the cell. The cadmium negative electrode is formed of a pasted grid. Electrolytes are solutions of potassium hydroxide in water. Cells are provide with vent caps to prevent reaction of the electrolyte with carbon dioxide in the air. Theoretically as little of two grams of silver are required for each ampere-hour of capacity, but practical cells require between 3 and 3.5 grams. Because the charging voltage is higher than the discharge voltage, the watt-hour efficiency of a silver–cadmium cell is about 70%; ampere-hour efficiency is about 98%. The usual recommended charging method is constant-current charging at a 10 or 20 hour rate, (restoring the capacity of the battery over 10 or 20 hours), and cut off of charging at 1.6 volts per cell. Cells are commercially manufactured from 2 to 2500 ampere-hours capacity, but are often customized for particular uses.

== See also ==
- List of battery types
