= Jonathan Abrams (businessman) =

Canadian engineer

- Occupations: Engineer, Entrepreneur, and Investor
- Known for: founder of Friendster
- Website: "nuzzel.com".

Jonathan Abrams is a Canadian engineer, entrepreneur, and investor. He is best known as the founder of Friendster where he worked from 2002 to 2005. He then founded Socializr, where he worked from 2005 to 2010, and Nuzzel, where he stayed from 2012 to 2018. He has invested in over 50 companies, including Docker and Instacart. He was the owner of a patent for a "System, method, and apparatus for connecting users in an online computer system based on their relationships within social networks". This, and Friendster's other patents, were bought by Facebook for $40 million in 2010.

As of March 2021, Abrams is a board member of Girls in Tech, and a co-founder and managing partner of Founders Den, a workplace for startups.

== Friendster ==
Friendster was an early social network that once boasted over 111 million users and was the inspiration behind MySpace and other more modern social networks. Google offered to buy the company in 2003 for $30 million in Google stock (about 200 million shares) before Google had IPO'd in 2005. That stock would have been worth $30 billion as of March 2021, but the offer was denied. Friendster was then funded by Kleiner Perkins and Benchmark with a valuation of $53 million in October 2003. In 2004, the Board of Directors removed him as CEO, and Tim Koogle took over as interim CEO.

== Startups ==
Abrams has continued working with startups, founding Socializr, another social network for sharing events with friends, which was purchased by Punchbowl. From 2012 to 2018, he worked on Nuzzel, an app for providing news and media intelligence. Abrams is currently a founder and managing partner of startup incubator Founders Den, which has hosted companies including AdBlock, Spigot, and Docker. He is currently one of the co-founders of 8-Bit Capital, a seed investment firm.
