= Elfster =

Social networking software for gift exchanges

- Website type: social shopping, social networking, wishlists
- Available in: English
- Owner: Peter Imburg
- Website: http://www.elfster.com
- Commercial: No
- Registration: required
- Launched: 2004
- Content license: proprietary

Elfster is a proprietary software application providing social networking features related to "secret Santa" style gift exchanges. It is available, without charge, as software as a service, via a website and via mobile apps for iOS and Android.

The website's features include a universal wishlist, an anonymous Q&A section, personalized gift recommendations, activity updates, and forum discussions. The company is headquartered in Delaware, United States.

== History ==
Elfster was founded by software engineer Peter Imburg in 2004 after hearing about the difficulty his wife and sister had when trying to organize a Secret Santa for their family.

In November 2011, the website reached 2 million members. In Christmas of the same year, the Elfster Facebook App was launched for mobile device users. The app also serves as an extension of Elfster.com's service.

== Services ==
Elfster can be used to create wishlists and organize online gift exchanges. Users can find friends in Elfster, and follow their wishlists. Items can be added from any site online, and with the Elfster mobile app, bar code scanning allows items to be added on the go. When organizing an online gift exchange, Elfster draws names randomly and allows users to ask their draw partner questions anonymously - maintaining secrecy in a "high-tech way".

Elfster provides a series of tools for organizing secret gift exchanges such as automated event-organization, name pairing, draw restrictions, gift guidance, wishlists, and anonymous questions and answers.

Elfster helps with the logistics of determining who wants to participate, drawing names, and communicating the names that were drawn, while identities remain secret

In December 2009, Elfster collaborated with Claire's to create Secret Santa Circle, a temporary Secret Santa website for the jewelry retailer.

In November 2010, new features were added including trending gifts, activity updates and the ability to suggest and share gift ideas.

== See also ==
Secret Santa
