= Waldemar Jungner =

Swedish inventor and engineer (1869–1924)

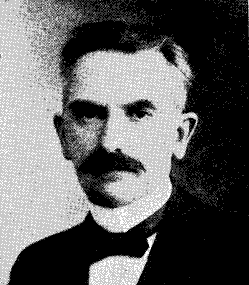
- Born: 19 June 1869; Västra Götaland County, Sweden
- Died: 30 August 1924 (aged 55)
- Occupations: engineer and inventor
- Awards: Swedish Chemical Society's Oscar Carlson Medal
- Engineering career
- Practice name: Ackumulator Aktiebolaget Jungner; Nya Ackumulator Aktiebolaget Jungner; Ackumulator Aktiebolaget Jungner
- Significant design: nickel-iron electric storage battery; nickel-cadmium battery; rechargeable alkaline silver-cadmium battery

Ernst Waldemar Jungner (19 June 1869 – 30 August 1924) was a Swedish inventor and engineer. In 1898 he invented the nickel-iron electric storage battery (NiFe), the nickel-cadmium battery (NiCd), and the rechargeable alkaline silver-cadmium battery (AgCd). As an inventor, he also fabricated a fire alarm based on different dilutions of metals. He also worked on the electrolytic production of sodium carbonate and patented a rock drilling device.

== Early life ==
Ernst Waldemar Jungner was born on 19 June 1869 in Västra Götaland County, Sweden. His parents were ministers, and his father died when Waldemar was 13 years old. In 1869, the year he was born, failed harvests caused famine throughout Sweden, which affected Jungner's health. He also contracted measles and scarlet fever.

== Education ==
Jungner attended Skara upper secondary school, and studied chemistry, mathematics, astronomy, botany, geology and Latin at Uppsala University. He went on to carry out further studies at the Royal Institute of Technology (KTH) in Stockholm.

== Business ==
In 1900 he started the firm "Ackumulator Aktiebolaget Jungner". There was a long patent dispute with Thomas Edison which was won by Edison in the end because he had larger financial resources. This caused serious problems for Jungner's firm. The company managed to survive by using a slightly different name "Nya Ackumulator Aktiebolaget Jungner" in 1904. Jungner left the management of the company at this time but remained a consultant to the new firm. This company was wound up in 1910, and a new company "Ackumulator Aktiebolaget Jungner" was created, which profitably used new technology developments. A descendant company "NiFe Junger" in 1991 became part of Saft Groupe S.A.

== Battery use ==
Nickel-cadmium batteries were commonly used in the power systems of rockets and artificial satellites throughout the 1960s and 1970s, as well as in terrestrial portable electrical devices.

On the rescue mission for Umberto Nobile and his companions on the North pole expedition in 1928, several batteries were dropped from an airplane to supply electricity to the radio of the expedition. Only the Jungner NiFe battery worked.

== Later life and death ==
Jungner patented designs for a fuel cell in 1907. He carried out investigations into the production of cement, and the extraction of radium from ores.

Jungner joined the Royal Swedish Academy of Engineering Sciences in 1922 and in 1924 he received the Swedish Chemical Society's Oscar Carlson Medal. Jungner died on 30 August 1924 of pneumonia at the age of 55.

== See also ==
- Batteries in space
