= Capsule endoscopy =

Medical imaging procedure

Wireless Capsule Endoscopy
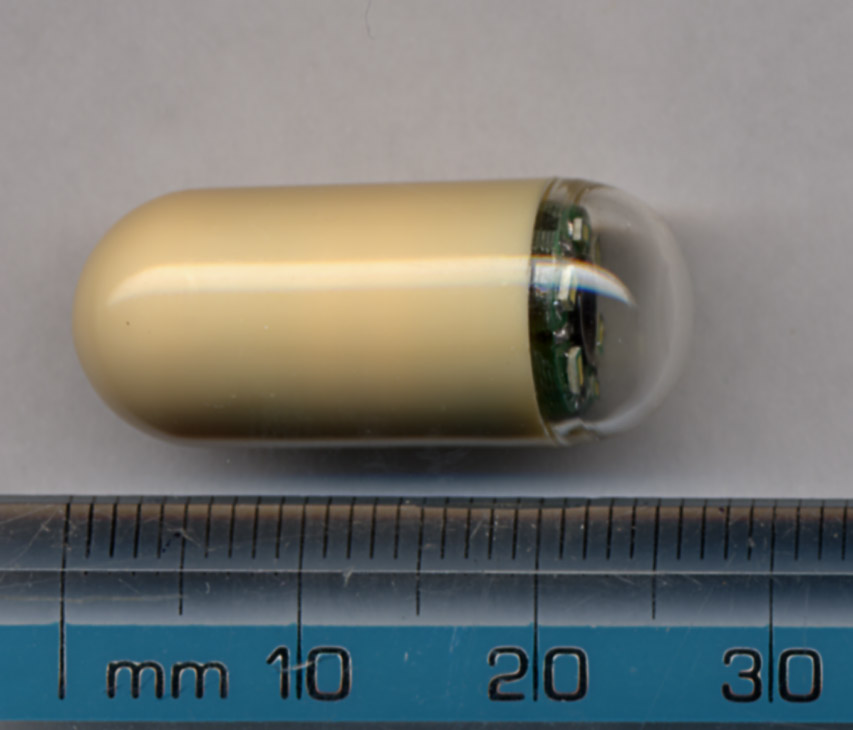
- Picture of a capsule
- MeSH: D053704
- OPS-301 code: 1-63a, 1-656

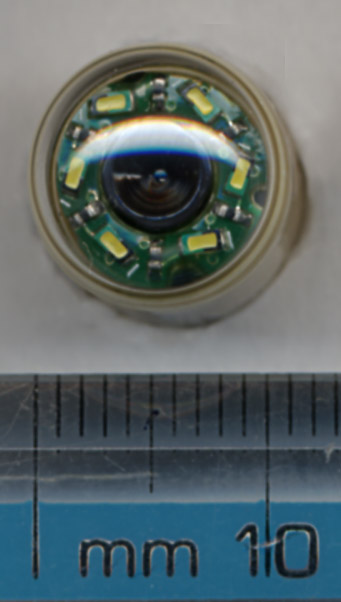
Endoscopic capsule end-on, showing six LEDs and camera lens.

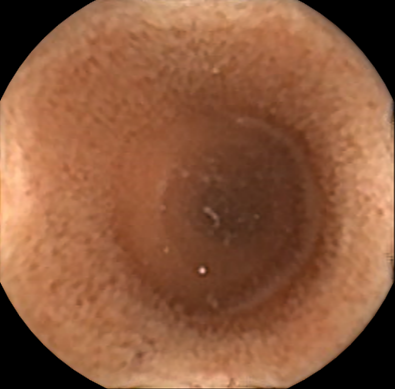
Image of the intestines acquired by capsule endoscopy

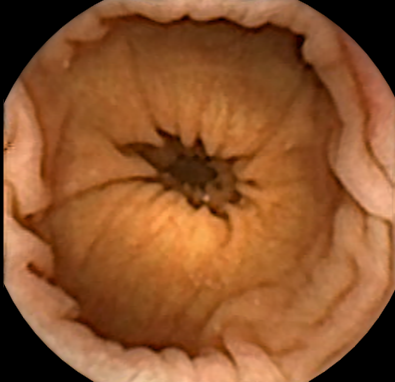
Image of the colon acquired by capsule endoscopy

Capsule endoscopy is a medical procedure used to record internal images of the gastrointestinal tract for use in disease diagnosis. Newer developments are also able to take biopsies and release medication at specific locations of the entire gastrointestinal tract. Unlike the more widely used endoscope, capsule endoscopy provides the ability to see the middle portion of the small intestine. It can be applied to the detection of various gastrointestinal cancers, digestive diseases, ulcers, unexplained bleedings, and general abdominal pains. After a patient swallows the capsule, it passes along the gastrointestinal tract, taking a number of images per second which are transmitted wirelessly to an array of receivers connected to a portable recording device carried by the patient. General advantages of capsule endoscopy over standard endoscopy include the minimally invasive procedure setup, ability to visualize more of the gastrointestinal tract, and lower cost of the procedure.

== History ==
Capsule endoscopy was first conceptualized by Israeli engineer Gavriel Iddan and Israeli gastroenterologist Eitan Scapa in Boston, Massachusetts, in the early 1980s. The two partners initially developed a CCD (charge-coupled device) camera-based imaging system using a fiber-optic tether, but the prototype suffered from high power consumption and slow image transmission.

In 1993, Iddan proposed separating the system into three components: a camera and transmitter, a recorder attached to a sensor array on the patient’s abdomen, and software for later image review by a physician. This design became viable after the CCD camera was replaced with a CMOS (complementary metal–oxide–semiconductor) sensor, which consumed far less energy.

In 2001, the U.S. Food and Drug Administration (FDA) approved the first capsule endoscope developed by Given Imaging, later commercialized as the PillCam. Since then, capsule endoscopy has been adopted worldwide for evaluating small bowel disorders.

In the 2010s and 2020s, continued advances in imaging, onboard data storage, and wireless power transmission have enabled new capsule designs capable of panoramic imaging, automated lesion detection, and even targeted drug delivery.

== Technology ==
Capsule endoscopy uses a small vitamin-sized wireless camera to capture images of a patient's digestive tract. The capsule typically contains miniature cameras, a light source, and either wireless or onboard data storage.

Early capsule systems required an external recorder worn by the patient, but newer models can store captured images internally for later retrieval and analysis. Some designs incorporate multiple cameras positioned around the capsule to provide a panoramic 360° field of view of the small bowel mucosa.

These advances have improved image completeness and patient convenience by reducing reliance on external recording devices. Continuing developments in capsule endoscopy also include longer battery life, expanded memory capacity, and cloud-based review systems for clinicians.

The field of view of capsule endoscopy depends on the number and placement of cameras within the capsule. Earlier designs with a single forward-facing camera typically captured between 140° and 170° of the intestinal surface, which could leave small blind spots behind folds in the mucosa. Newer panoramic systems using multiple laterally oriented cameras can image nearly the entire circumference of the small bowel, substantially reducing mucosal blind spots while maintaining a passive, untethered design.

There are several advantages to choosing capsule endoscopy over standard endoscopy. Standard endoscopy can be more uncomfortable for a patient, can be more prone to puncturing the digestive tract walls, and is not able to access the middle portion of the small intestine. Endoscopes must enter either through the mouth/nasal cavities or the rectum, limiting visualization of the entire small bowel.

In the United States, capsule endoscopy is most commonly performed when standard upper or lower endoscopy does not fully evaluate the small intestine or identify a source of symptoms such as bleeding or pain. Further innovation continues to improve image quality, battery performance, and diagnostic yield to expand clinical applications.

== Medical uses ==
Esophagogastroduodenoscopy (EGD), employs a camera attached to a long flexible tube to view the upper portion of the gastrointestinal tract, namely the esophagus, the stomach, and the beginning of the first part of the small intestine called the duodenum. A colonoscope, inserted through the rectum, can view the colon and the distal portion of the small intestine, the terminal ileum. These two types of endoscopy however cannot visualize the majority of the middle portion of the small intestine.

Capsule endoscopy is therefore used to examine parts of the gastrointestinal tract that cannot be seen by standard endoscopy. It is useful when the disease is suspected in the small intestine, and can sometimes be used to find the site of gastrointestinal bleeding or the cause of unexplained abdominal pain, such as Crohn's disease. However, unlike EGD or colonoscopy, it cannot be used to treat pathology that may be discovered. Common reasons for using capsule endoscopy include diagnosis of unexplained bleeding, iron deficiency, or abdominal pain, searching for polyps, ulcers, and tumors of the small intestine, and diagnosis of inflammatory bowel disease. Capsule endoscopy should be preferred in cases of unexplained bleeding and celiac disease, whereas ultrasound should be considered an early step in the diagnosis and follow-up of IBD even in patients with a proximal small bowel localization of the disease.

The images collected by the miniature camera during a session are transferred wirelessly to an external receiver worn by the patient, using any one of a band of appropriate frequencies. The collected images are then transferred to a computer for display, review, and diagnosis. A transmitted radio-frequency signal emitted by some capsules can be used to accurately estimate the location of the capsule and to track it in real-time inside the body and gastrointestinal tract. Capsule endoscopy can still not yet replace standard endoscopy for various diseases, as is the case for those with cirrhosis.

As of 2014, research was targeting additional sensing mechanisms and localization and motion control systems to enable new applications for the technology, for example, drug delivery. Wireless energy transmission was also being investigated as a way of providing a continuous energy source for the capsule.

== Procedure ==
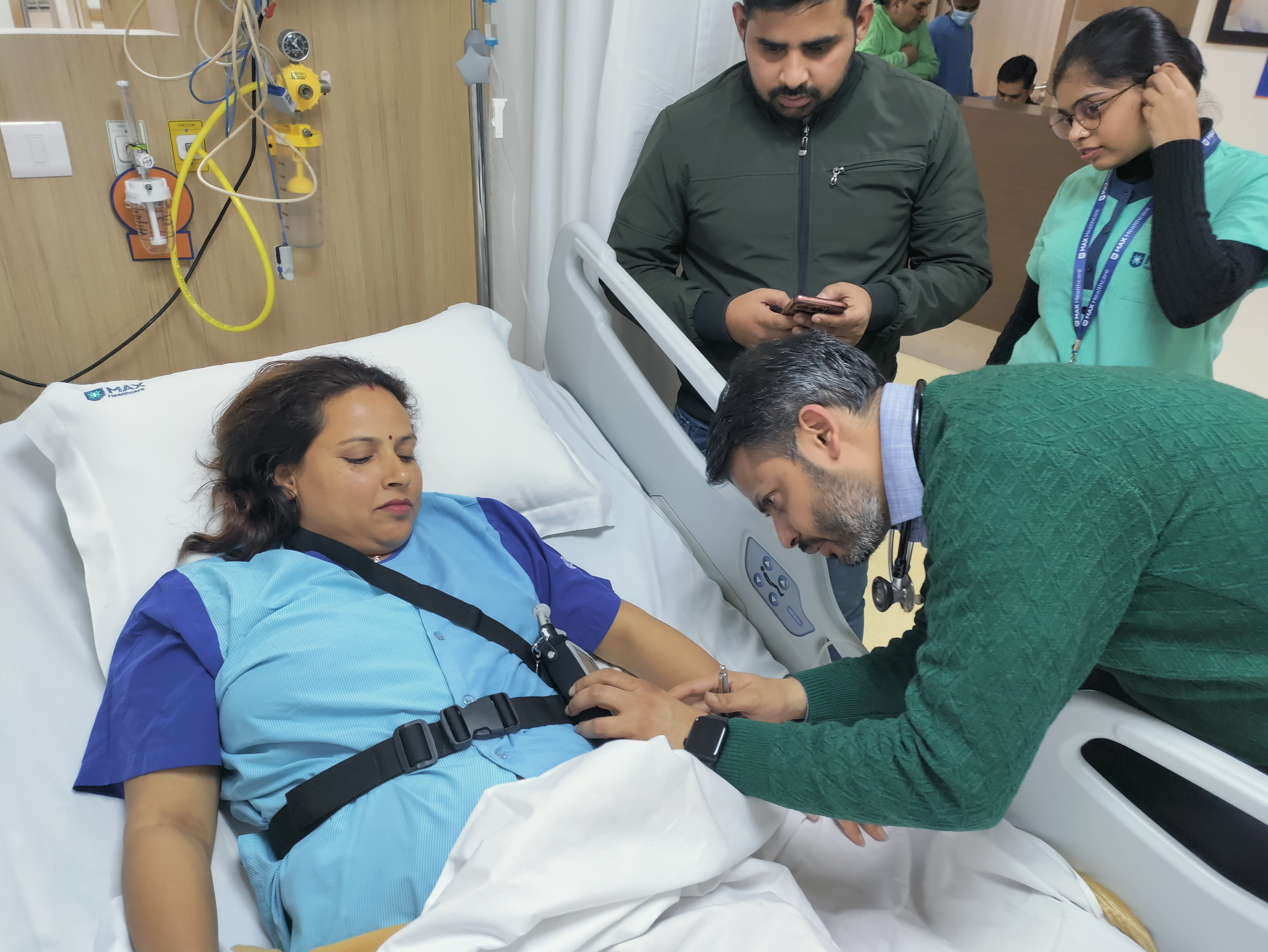
Doctor observing the Capsule Endoscopy recorder.

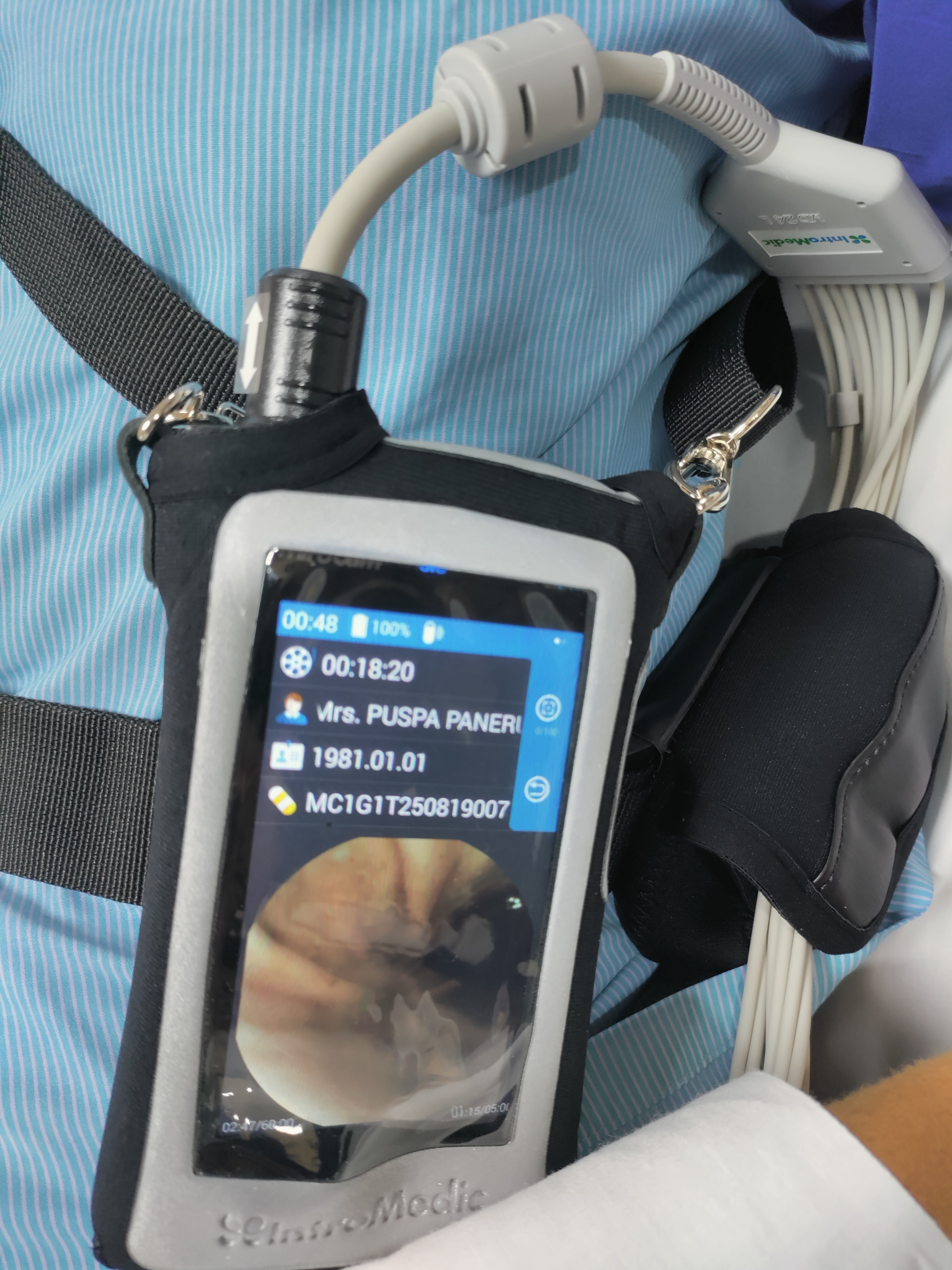
A capsule endoscopy data recorder worn by a patient during the procedure.

Capsule endoscopy requires a number of different preparatory procedures to ensure clear images are taken of a patient's gastrointestinal tract for an accurate diagnosis of disease. There are various types of capsule endoscopes, but for a generalized description, one can assume the most common setup requires the capsule, sensor array, storage unit, and computer system being used. First, a patient will need to have the sensor array placed on their abdomen with a recording unit worn as a belt. The patient may be asked to stay at the hospital or return home depending on the start time. Next, the pill must be swallowed by the patient. After approximately 8 hours the sensor array can be removed and returned to a physician. The capsule will be excreted through regular bowel movements.

During the procedure, there are a number of different policies to follow. A patient should only drink clear liquids for the first two hours after swallowing the pill and may eat after 4 hours. MRI studies, ham radios, metal detectors, and strenuous physical activity should all be avoided. Additionally, all external equipment must be kept dry.

== Manufacturers ==
As of 2022, there are a number of manufacturers who produce capsule endoscopes. The technology was originally developed by Israeli scientists, Gavriel Iddan and Eitan Scapa, with the first pill swallowed in 1997; Iddan founded Given Imaging in Israel, which received FDA approval in 2001. Medtronic today (2024) produces one of the more widely used capsule endoscope systems called the *PillCam*, having sold over 4 million units. Medtronic purchased the PillCam system from Given Imaging in 2014.

Another capsule endoscopy system is CapsoCam Plus® (CapsoVision, Inc., United States). The CapsoCam Plus capsule employs four laterally oriented cameras to provide a 360° panoramic view of the small-bowel mucosa and records images internally in onboard memory instead of using an external recording device. A prospective, dual-center study reported that the CapsoCam SV-1 achieved complete small-bowel image acquisition in all patients and visualized the duodenal papilla in over 70% of cases, with no capsule-related adverse events. A comparative study from Hiroshima University Hospital found that *CapsoCam Plus®* achieved complete small-bowel visualization in 97% of patients versus 73% for the forward-view *PillCam SB3* capsule (p = 0.006) and visualized the papilla of Vater in 82% versus 15% of cases (p < 0.001). The device received U.S. Food and Drug Administration (FDA) 510(k) clearance in 2016.

== Side effects ==
Capsule endoscopy is considered to be a very safe method for gastrointestinal tract examination. The capsule is usually excreted with a patient's feces within 24–48 hours after ingestion. There has been a single report of retention of the capsule lasting almost four and a half years although the patient was asymptomatic. However, the risk of bowel obstruction may be countered by an abdominal X-ray to locate the device for removal by endoscopy or surgery.

=== Risk of retention ===
In a review of 22,840 cases, the capsule was retained 1.4% of the time, with Crohn's disease a common cause; most were surgically removed. The rate of capsule retention varies by the indication for the procedure, with the highest rate seen with known Crohn's disease (5-13%), followed by obscure gastrointestinal bleeding (1.5%), suspected Crohn's disease (1.4%), and healthy volunteers (0%). Risk factors for capsule retention include Crohn's disease, NSAID use, and abdominal radiation.
