= Gavriel Iddan =

Israeli engineer

- גבריאל עידן
- Born: October 1, 1941 (age 84); Haifa, Israel
- Known for: Inventor of wireless capsule endoscopy
- Awards: European Inventor Award nominee (2011)
- Scientific career
- Fields: Electro-optical engineering
- Institutions: RAFAEL Armament Development Authority

Gavriel Iddan (Hebrew: גבריאל עידן) is an Israeli electro-optical engineer and the inventor of wireless capsule endoscopy. Initially at RAFAEL Armament Development Authority working on guided missile technology, Iddan got the idea for an endoscopic capsule while on sabbatical in Boston from a neighbour of his, an Israeli gastroenterologist suffering from undiagnosed stomach pain. After working on the idea for almost twenty years, he successfully created a prototype in 1998 – a disposable pill-sized camera that passes straight through the digestive tract, continuously broadcasting to an external receiver. Iddan's invention was approved by the FDA in 2001. In 2011 he became a European Inventor Award nominee.

Iddan was born in October 1941 in Haifa, Israel. He is married (second time) and has 3 sons and 7 grand sons. One of his sons is Roy Iddan, an Israeli writer and media personality.
