= Excel mobile phones =

UK phone business

The Excel/Excell marketed a range of mobile phones developed by the British company Technophone in the 1980s. These mobile phones were advertised as the smallest, lightest most intelligent mobile phones in the world at that time, and were the first to fit in a pocket. While larger than later mobile telephones at 7 inches tall, 3 inches wide and 1 inch deep, they were still more compact than other mobile cell phones of their time, which included models by Motorola and Stornophone, as well as dedicated car phones.

Technophone was commissioned by the controlling shareholder of Millicom, Jan Stenbeck for Vodafone and his Swedish cellular firm, Comvik. It also received a research and development grant from the Department of Trade and Industry (DTI) to develop the M1. DTI sought insight into how the mobile could change from an expensive professional electronics item only affordable by industry executives and millionaires to a mass consumer product. It led the DTI to create the conditions for the personal communications network transformation in the seminal consultation document "Phones on the Move".

The M1 (PC105T) turned the hand-portable phone into the world's first pocket-sized cell phone.

The phone cost around £2500 when first launched and some owners were Terence Trent Darby, David Steel, Joan Collins and Jonathon Morris from the popular Liverpool-based TV show Bread. The Excell phone range were also featured in the TV show owned by the character Joey who brandished his phone everywhere he went. The phones were actually dummy phones created by members of the mobile phone repair team.

== Background ==
Technophone Limited was set up in 1984 by Nils Mårtensson, a Swedish radio engineer who had left Ericsson. The company made mobile phones in the UK under the Excell label, and also made phones for other companies such as Deutsche Bundespost and Olivetti. Technophone sold their mobile phones through Excell Communications branded as the Excell M1 and M2 or PC105T. Excell Communications was started by Cheshire-based entrepreneurs, and the company later handed over management Michael Goldstone. The company had a heavy sales emphasis, and sales agents were very highly paid.

The Pocketphone PC105T was released in 1986 and retailed at £1,990; as the adverts showed, it would fit inside a standard-sized shirt pocket. Technophone was awarded the Queen's Award for Enterprise: Innovation (Technology) in 1988 for its development.

Technophone Ltd held 80% of the shares of Excell Communications Ltd when it was sold to Dial-A-Phone Mobile in 1989. Technophone was sold by Mårtensson for around £50 million in 1991 to Nokia. The factory in Camberley, Surrey used by Technophone was then used for the development and manufacture of the base stations which make the networks' mobile phones work on Nokia Networks. The mobile phone part of the business was split into various areas around the world and has become part of Nokia Mobile Phones, with phones designed and made globally.

== Phones ==
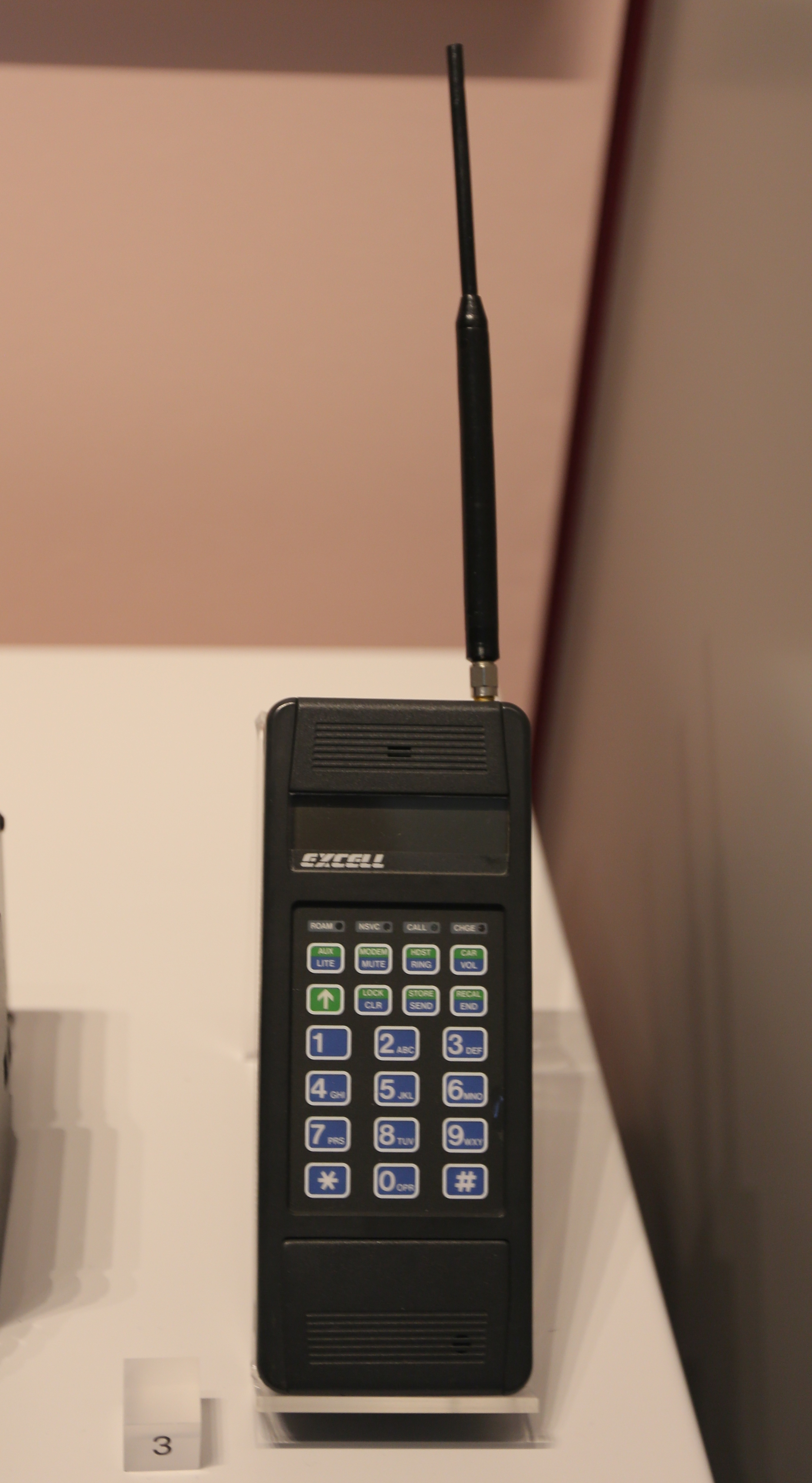
An EXCELL PC105T

== Accessories ==
A range of accessories was available, including:

- In-car charger
- Hands-free car kit
- Desktop charger
- Short stubby aerial
- Long aerial
- Leather carrying case

== Networks ==
At the time the phones had to be contractually subscribed to one of the two major mobile phone networks, Vodafone and Cellnet.
