= AppLovin =

American mobile technology company

AppLovin Corporation
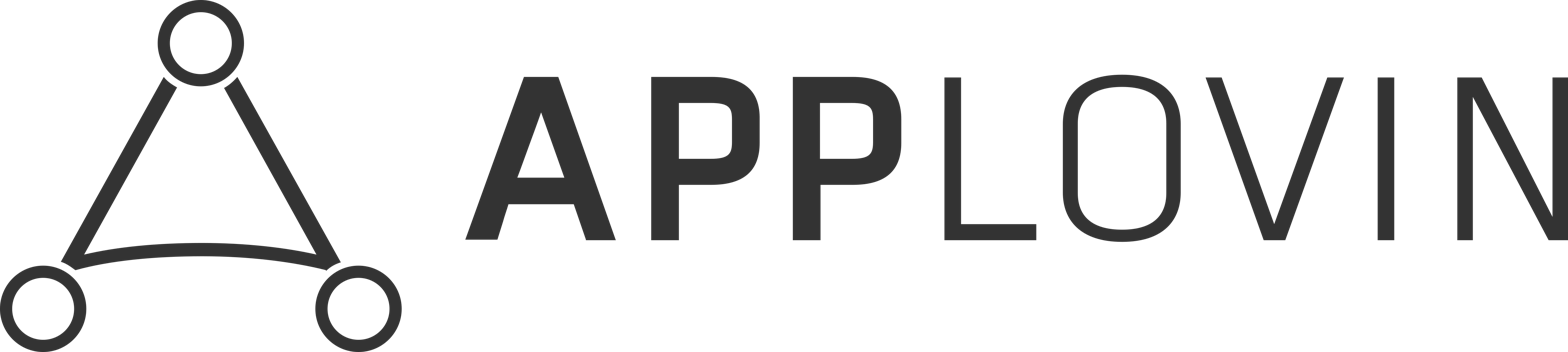
- Type: Public
- Traded as: Nasdaq: APP (Class A); Nasdaq-100 component; S&P 500 component
- Industry: Mobile technology
- Founded: 2012; 14 years ago
- Founders: Adam Foroughi; Andrew Karam; John Krystynak
- Headquarters: Stanford Research Park, Palo Alto, California, U.S.
- Area served: Worldwide
- Key people: Adam Foroughi (CEO)
- Revenue: ▲US$5.48 billion (2025)
- Operating income: ▲US$4.15 billion (2025)
- Net income: ▲US$3.33 billion (2025)
- Total assets: ▲US$7.26 billion (2025)
- Total equity: ▲US$2.13 billion (2025)
- Number of employees: 898 (2025)
- Subsidiaries: MoPub
- Website: applovin.com

AppLovin Corporation is an American mobile technology company headquartered in Palo Alto, California. Founded in 2012, the company helps developers market, monetize, analyze and publish their apps through its mobile advertising, marketing, and analytics platforms, SSP MAX; DSP AppDiscovery; and SparkLabs creative studio. The company also invests in various mobile game publishers.

== History ==
AppLovin was founded in 2012 by Adam Foroughi, John Krystynak, and Andrew Karam. Foroughi stated that the AppLovin name came from Bloglovin', a content organizing company, contrary to reports of a homage to the Christopher Mintz-Plasse character from the 2007 film Superbad.

The company operated in stealth mode until 2014, raising $4 million in financing from angel investors, Streamlined Ventures and the Webb Investment Network. Before emerging from stealth mode, AppLovin acquired customers, including Opentable and Spotify. The company was ranked #10 on the 2016 Deloitte Fast 500 North America list, and again in 2018. Foroughi was recognized on the 2017 San Francisco Business Times "40 Under 40" list.

In July 2018, AppLovin launched Lion Studios, which works with mobile developers to publish and promote their games. A convertible note facility previously received from Hontai Capital was fully refinanced in August 2018, after AppLovin raised a significant credit facility from U.S.-based investors. Hontai retains a small equity stake in AppLovin. That same month, the private equity firm KKR & Co. Inc. acquired a minority stake in AppLovin for $400 million.

In 2020, it added partnerships with Adjust and Facebook Audience Network to its in-app bidding for developers, and was ranked by Pocket Gamer on its list of Top 50 Mobile Game Makers. That year, 49% of the company's revenue came from businesses using its software and 51% from consumers making in-app purchases.

In March 2021, the company filed for an IPO to raise $100 million. On April 15, 2021, AppLovin became a public company, trading on the Nasdaq under the ticker APP; it began trading at US$70 per share, with a total valuation of approximately US$24 billion.

In July 2025, Barron's reported that the company was valued at $123 billion.

On September 22, 2025, Applovin was added to the S&P 500 index.

== Acquisitions and divestments ==
AppLovin also has also invested in software development companies, and various mobile game publishers. In October 2014, it purchased the German mobile ad-network Moboqo.

On September 26, 2016, it was reported that AppLovin had agreed to be acquired by the Chinese private equity firm, Orient Hontai Capital, for $1.42 billion; the acquisition deal was subsequently abandoned for debt investment after opposition to the plans from CFIUS.

In September 2018, AppLovin acquired the in-app bidding SSP MAX.

In 2019, the company acquired SafeDK, a software development kit management platform for ad quality, performance, and stability in mobile apps. That year, it also invested in several mobile game studios including PeopleFun, Firecraft Studios and Belka Games.

In February 2020, AppLovin invested in the mobile game studios Geewa, and Redemption Games, and acquired Machine Zone (MZ).

In February 2021, AppLovin announced the acquisition of mobile app measurement company Adjust. On October 6, 2021, AppLovin announced the acquisition of mobile monetization company MoPub from Twitter for $1.1 billion. The sale was finalized on January 3, 2022.

On August 9, 2022, AppLovin made an offer to buy Unity Technologies in exchange for $17.54 billion of stock. The merger proposal would result in Unity CEO John Riccitiello becoming the CEO of the combined entity. AppLovin's bid would require Unity to terminate its recent deal to merge with ironSource. Later that month, Unity's board rejected the offer and committed to complete its acquisition of ironSource.

In April 2025, the company bid to acquire the United States subsidiary of TikTok after the US government required TikTok to divest from Chinese company ByteDance or be banned.

Announced in February 2025, Applovin agreed to vest its mobile games development business to a private company for $900 million, including $500 million in cash, and focus on its advertising business. The sale, which includes Lion Studios, to London-based Tripledot Studios was adjusted in May 2025, to $400 million in cash and a 20% stake in Tripledot, completed on June 30, 2025, for a total value of $800 million. The ten studios sold were Athena Studio, Belka Games, Clipwire Games, Leyi, Lion Studios, Machine Zone, Magic Tavern, PeopleFun, Zenlife Games and Zeroo Gravity; their games include Game of War, Mobile Strike, Project Makeover and Wordscapes.

== Ownership ==
The largest shareholders are the CEO Adam Foroughi and the investor Hao Tang.

== Controversies ==
On February 26, 2025, short seller firm Fuzzy Panda Research alleged AppLovin committed ad fraud and illegally tracked children and served them sexual ads. On October 6, 2025, Bloomberg reported the SEC was looking into AppLovin regarding their data-collection practices, though remains unconfirmed, in 2026, by the SEC.

CapitalWatch accused AppLovin shareholders of committing financial crimes in concert with Prince Group founder Chen Zhi, in a report published in January 2026, The Southeast Asian Money LaunderingSyndicate’s NASDAQ "Laundromat", Following a demand letter for retraction from AppLovin, CapitalWatch issued an apology and retracted some passages on February 4, though without removing the January report from its website. While characterized in media as a short-seller report, CapitalWatch stated that it is not a short seller, but an independent media outlet with no financial stake in AppLovin.

== See also ==
- IronSource
- InMobi
- AdMob
- List of advertising technology companies
- List of unicorn startup companies
