= Final Fantasy XV: A New Empire =

2017 massively multiplayer online strategy game

- Developer: Epic Action
- Publisher: MZ
- Series: Final Fantasy
- Platforms: Android, iOS, iPadOS
- Release: June 29, 2017
- Genre: Strategy
- Mode: Multiplayer

Final Fantasy XV: A New Empire was a freemium massively multiplayer online strategy game developed by Epic Action and published by MZ. The game was shut down on December 30th, 2024.

The game is based on the 2016 action role-playing game Final Fantasy XV, and features its characters and soundtrack. The game's marketing campaign featured American model Alexis Ren. As of January 2019, the game received more than 51 million downloads and has grossed more than $518 million.

== Gameplay ==
The game plays as a strategy video game with city-building elements. Players build a base and upgrade their structures by mining resources. They train armies to defend against attacking players and can set wall defenses. The game employs a guild system as its social component. Upon joining a guild, players can accumulate Loyalty that is used to purchase special items. Guild members can help each other complete building projects to upgrade their structures faster. Guilds also have their own quests, or timed progress bars, that reward players further. As a free-to-play title, the game contains in-app purchases.

== Development and release ==
Final Fantasy XV: A New Empire was developed by MZ through a subsidiary company called Epic Action LLC. Square Enix provided a "crash course" on art direction for the game to developers from MZ. Reviewers have remarked on the similarity of A New Empire to Game of War: Fire Age, another game developed by MZ, with some calling it "a blatant clone" of the latter.

Final Fantasy XV: A New Empire was released worldwide on June 28, 2017. The game's marketing campaign featured American model Alexis Ren.

== Reception ==
Overall, the app elicited a variety of responses from reviewers that critiqued the game's use of the Final Fantasy XV franchise, the base-building gameplay, and the marketing of purchasable add-ons. Jennifer Allen of Gamezebo criticized the gameplay as "soullessly exploitative" and "repetitive to the extreme". Ryan Whitwam of Android Police called the game "pay to win junk", calling it a "generic city builder with on-the-rails combat dressed up like a Final Fantasy title". Additionally, critics expressed frustration over the game's tutorial, as it focused primarily on the mechanics to build a base and detracted from other core gameplay elements.

Other media outlets viewed the game's interpretation of the Final Fantasy universe to be poor, at the expense of MZ better reaching its intended audience. Edgar Cervantes of Android Authority offered: "We must take into consideration that this was probably an attempt to expand from the usual" in order to appeal to "casual mobile gamers".

Similarly, Polygon's Allegra Frank compared the differences in App Store ratings between Final Fantasy fans and Mobile Strike players: "There's little in common between A New Empire and the game it's based on. That's fine, in theory; they're on vastly different platforms, and MZ and Square Enix are clear about A New Empire's difference from the standard Final Fantasy XV".

=== Downloads and revenue ===
By October 2017, the game received more than 20 million downloads and was the 14th top-grossing game on the American App Store. In its first year, by June 2018, the game received more than 45 million downloads on the App Store and Google Play. The United States accounts for 32% of the game's downloads, while Japan accounts for 5% of its downloads.

By January 2018 it was the month's ninth highest-grossing game on the Google Play Store, where it grossed $14.27 million. In one year, by June, the game had grossed more than $380 million. The United States accounted for $138 million of the game's revenue, while Japan accounted for $116 million of its revenue. As of November 2018, the game has grossed more than $485 million worldwide. By January 2019, total downloads reached 51 million and the game has grossed more than $518 million in revenue.
