= Papa Louie =

American video game series

- Artwork of the first 14 Papa Louie games
- Genre: Strategy
- Developers: Matt Neff; Tony Solary
- Publisher: Flipline Studios
- Platforms: Browser; iOS, Android; Steam
- First release: Papa Louie: When Pizzas Attack! November 9, 2006; 20 years ago
- Latest release: Papa's Mocharia Deluxe; June 2, 2026; 5 months ago

The Papa Louie series is a series of platforming and time management video games created by Flipline Studios. The first installment, Papa Louie: When Pizzas Attack!, was released as a free-to-play Flash game on November 9, 2006, with future games being released on mobile devices (under the To Go! subtitle) and Steam (under the Deluxe subtitle). The web games—often referred to as Gamerias—were initially impacted by the shutdown of Adobe Flash on December 31, 2020, but can be played on websites including Cool Math Games and CrazyGames using Flash Player emulators such as AwayFL or Ruffle.

== Gameplay ==
Screenshot of the Bread Station in Papa's Pastaria To Go!

Release timeline
2006	Papa Louie: When Pizzas Attack!
2007	Papa's Pizzeria
2008
2009
2010	Papa's Burgeria
2011	Papa's Taco Mia!
2011	Papa's Freezeria
2012	Papa's Pancakeria
2012	Papa's Burgeria HD
2012	Papa's Wingeria
2012	Papa's Hot Doggeria
2013	Papa's Burgeria To Go!
2013	Papa Louie 2: When Burgers Attack!
2013	Papa's Cupcakeria
2013	Papa's Freezeria HD
2013	Papa's Pastaria
2014	Papa's Freezeria To Go!
2014	Papa's Donuteria
2014	Papa's Wingeria HD
2014	Papa's Pizzeria To Go!
2015	Papa Louie 3: When Sundaes Attack!
2015	Papa's Cheeseria
2015	Papa's Cupcakeria To Go!
2015	Papa's Cupcakeria HD
2016	Papa's Bakeria
2016	Papa's Taco Mia HD
2016	Slider Scouts
2016	Papa's Sushiria
2017	Papa's Taco Mia To Go!
2017	Papa's Pancakeria HD
2017	Papa's Pizzeria HD
2017	Papa's Hot Doggeria HD
2017	Papa's Hot Doggeria To Go!
2018	Papa Louie Pals
2018	Papa's Scooperia
2018	Papa's Scooperia HD
2018	Papa's Scooperia To Go!
2018	Papa's Pancakeria To Go!
2019	Papa's Wingeria To Go!
2019	Unfinished Sarge Game Demo
2019	Papa's Donuteria To Go!
2019	Papa's Cheeseria To Go!
2020	Papa's Bakeria To Go!
2020	Papa's Sushiria To Go!
2020	Papa's Pastaria To Go!
2021	Papa's Mocharia To Go!
2022	Papa's Cluckeria To Go!
2023	Papa's Freezeria Deluxe
2024	Papa's Paleteria To Go!
2024	Papa's Pizzeria Deluxe
2025
2026	Papa's Mocharia Deluxe
TBA	Papa's Paleteria Deluxe

Playing as either a preselected male or female character or a custom character, players are tasked with running one of Papa Louie's various fast food restaurants. The time management games (or Gamerias) typically involve four stations: One for taking orders, two for cooking and preparing food, and a final station for plating and serving the finished meal. Players are tasked with accurately and quickly completing customers' orders, which awards them tips and points that contribute to the player's rank. Accurate orders also reward the player with stars that can promote a customer to Bronze, Silver, or Gold awards, which increase tips, the speed at which customers order, and the amount of points they give. In later games, earning enough points rewards the player with tickets that can be used to play minigames. These minigames can reward the player with cosmetic items.

Unique customers include various closers, who give complex orders at the end of the work day, and Jojo the Food Critic, who orders something new each time and gives a Blue Ribbon that temporarily boosts tips for 3 days if served properly. In some entries of the series, customers can order via a delivery phone or sit down in the dining room. The ultimate goal of the game is to unlock Papa Louie as a customer. In Gamerias up until Papa's Freezeria, this is done by achieving a Gold award for every other customer in the game. In subsequent entries, the criteria was changed to reaching a certain rank, which is typically rank 65 during the last unlockable holiday.

In games after Pizzeria, tips earned from completing orders can be used by the player to purchase kitchen upgrades, decor, and clothing. In Cupcakeria, seasonal holidays were introduced that boost the decor points of holiday related items and increase the amount of tips awarded when the player's character is wearing a holiday related outfit. In Cheeseria, special recipes with beneficial effects were added that once earned, can be selected as a day's special. They replace certain customers usual orders and have to be cross-referenced by the player from a cookbook.

== Development ==
The first game featuring Papa Louie was the platformer Papa Louie: When Pizzas Attack!, which was released on November 9, 2006. The game stars the titular chef, who must run and jump through various food-themed locations to save his kidnapped customers. After the success of this game, developer Flipline Studios transitioned to full-time game development and began work on a spin-off, Papa's Pizzeria, starring Papa Louie's nephew, Roy. The game was released in 2007 to even more success than its predecessor.

After Papa's Pizzeria was released, Flipline Studios began to expand. In total, there are 17 different games in the Papa Louie series. Due to most game titles ending in -eria, the Papa Louie games are often collectively referred to as Gamerias.

Since 2012, Gamerias designed for mobile phones and tablets have been released on Google Play and the App Store, making them accessible on mobile devices. Throughout the years, these games have performed successfully. In 2018, Papa's Scooperia HD was in the top 10 in paid iPad games in the UK, and Papa's Freezeria To Go! was in the top 10 in paid iPhone games in the UK. The success of these games has continued for nearly a decade, with Papa's Freezeria To Go! being the sixth top paid iPhone game in 2023, according to Apple.

A remake of Papa's Freezeria, Papa's Freezeria Deluxe, was released on Steam in 2023 to "overwhelmingly positive" reviews.

== Flipline Studios ==
Flipline IDS LLC
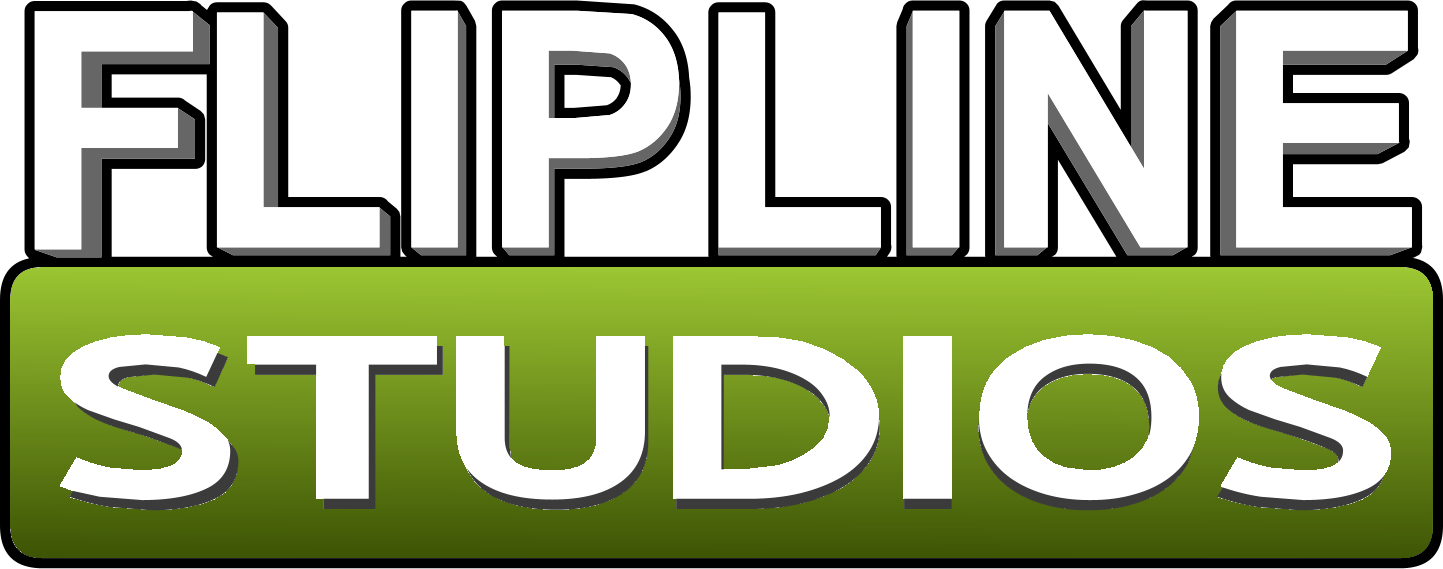
- Type: Private
- Industry: Video games
- Founded: February 28, 2005
- Founders: Matt Neff; Tony Solary
- Headquarters: Cleveland, Ohio
- Products: Papa Louie
- Number of employees: 2
- Website: flipline.com

Flipline IDS LLC, also known as Flipline Studios, is an American video game development company which mainly produces online games, mobile games, and PC games made in Adobe Flash. It was founded by Matt Neff and Tony Solary in 2004 in Cleveland, Ohio. Flipline Studios is best known for producing the Papa Louie series.

=== 2004–2006: Early years and web design ===
Matt Neff and Tony Solary were two digital arts students at the Cleveland Institute of Art. During their time at college, they made The Mawglin: Rise of the Half-Breed, a side-scrolling role-playing game, and worked with clients such as Donley's, a construction company and the Cleveland Museum of Art.

After graduation, Neff and Solary wanted to make a digital design company, and founded Flipline Interactive Design Studios (shortened to Flipline IDS) in May 2004. It initially focused on web animation and web design, while continuing to work with clients. Their first product was an unreleased television series set in Antarctica, named Freezing Pointe. Jurgen Faust said about its creation, "Neff and Solary made more money than they paid tuition". He also said that they were capable of making a business before they started.

The name Flipline was decided in college while trying to find a name that rhymes with "design" and had a .com domain that was not taken. Initially, Neff and Solary wanted to use the name "Flipline Design", but they forwent this idea after graduation because it "sounded a little too rhyme-y."

Other personal projects made by them during this time include 555 Modified, a clothing shop for punk rock bands and FlipChat, a messaging service. They also went under the trade name of Frozen Dinner Studios.

On February 28, 2005, Neff and Solary legally established Flipline IDS LLC.

=== 2006–2020: Papa Louie and online games ===
In 2006, Flipline discontinued Freezing Pointe and started releasing Adobe Flash games. Their first games were Guppy Guard Express and Meteor Blastor. Later that year, they released Papa Louie: When Pizzas Attack!, starting the Papa Louie series. In 2007, Flipline completely moved away from web design and officially transitioned to strictly creating Flash games.

In 2018, Flipline launched their last web game to run on Adobe Flash, Papa's Scooperia. In 2020, they moved away from the Adobe Flash platform when Adobe announced its discontinuation.

=== 2019–present: Focus on mobile and PC games ===
In 2019, Flipline announced that they would stop making "HD" games, as their "To Go!" games could be played on both small and large screen sizes from then on.

The studio expanded into the PC market in 2023 with the release of Papa's Freezeria Deluxe on Steam, a reimagining of the 2011 title that incorporated features from later games such as custom worker creation and seasonal holidays. In November 2024, following the launch of Papa's Paleteria To Go!, they remastered their original Gameria, releasing Papa's Pizzeria Deluxe. After the May 2025 release of the crafting-focused sequel Jacksmith: Weapons and Warriors, Flipline announced Papa's Mocharia Deluxe in April 2026. Released on June 2, 2026, this version represents the first 'Deluxe' adaption of a previously mobile-exclusive Gameria. Papa’s Paleteria Deluxe was announced on November 17, 2026.

=== Other games ===
Title	Release date	References
Guppy Guard Express	October 17, 2006	
Meteor Blastor	October 17, 2006	
Rock Garden Deluxe	2008 (paid) June 29, 2010 (free)	
Remnants of Skystone	March 22, 2010	
The Expendables 8-Bit	July 12, 2010	
Steak and Jake	August 27, 2010	
Steak and Jake: Midnight March	October 19, 2010	
Cactus McCoy and the Curse of Thorns	March 10, 2011	
Cactus McCoy 2: The Ruins of Calavera	October 6, 2011	
Jacksmith	September 27, 2012	
Jacksmith: Weapons and Warriors	May 13, 2025	
