= Struckd =

3D mobile game creation platform

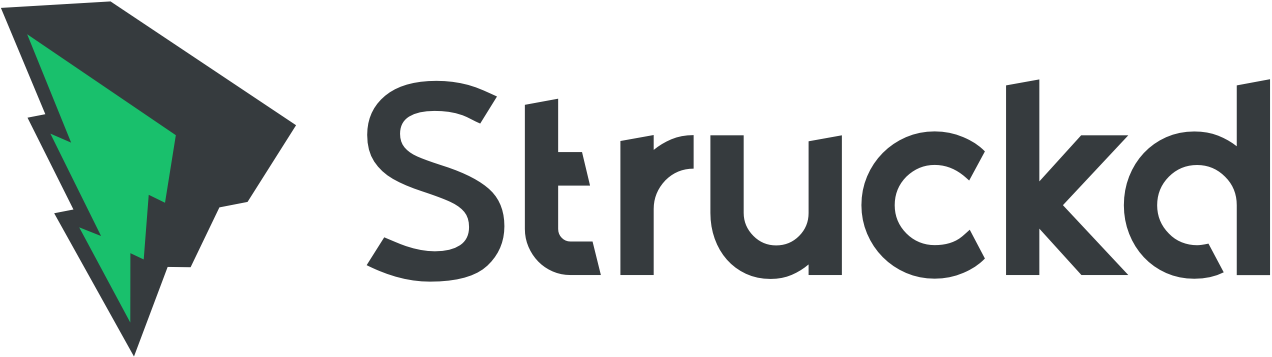
- Developer: Struckd AG (Unity Technologies)
- Operating system: iOS, Android, Web browser
- Type: Game creation system
- License: Proprietary

Struckd was a mobile game creation platform that allowed users to create, share and play 3D games. Founded in 2016 in Zurich, Switzerland, the company and platform were acquired by Unity Technologies in August 2021. Struckd was shut down on August 1st, 2026.

== History ==
The Struckd application was initially developed and launched on both Android and iOS in 2016 by Flurin Jenal and Silvan Bauser. The platform was designed to make game creation accessible on mobile devices without requiring programming knowledge.

In early 2021, Daniel Reichert was appointed to lead the future development of the Struckd platform as the new CEO of the company.

By April 2021, users had created over one million games on the platform, and its user base had reached approximately six million players. According to the company, this growth was achieved organically without paid marketing.

In August 2021, the application and its underlying technology were acquired by Unity Technologies. Following the acquisition, Struckd continued to operate as a Unity product. In 2024, the application's user-generated content (UGC) capabilities were expanded to web browsers through a partnership with the gaming platform CrazyGames. Struckd officially shut down on August 1st, 2026.

== Platform and features ==
Struckd operated as a game creation system that allowed users to build, play, and share 3D games. The platform offered an asset library with which creators could assemble games of a variety of genres like racing, role-playing games (RPGs), and multiplayer experiences.

Once a game was created, it could be published within the Struckd ecosystem and played on both mobile and web devices. The most popular Struckd games were played by more than one million players. Struckd Showdown was the most played game on the platform, with a total play count of nearly 4.2 million plays.

An exporter for the Unity Editor was available to export Struckd games outside the Struckd ecosystem.

On August 1, 2026, Struckd was shut down.
