= Danny Lange =

Danish computer scientist (born 1962)

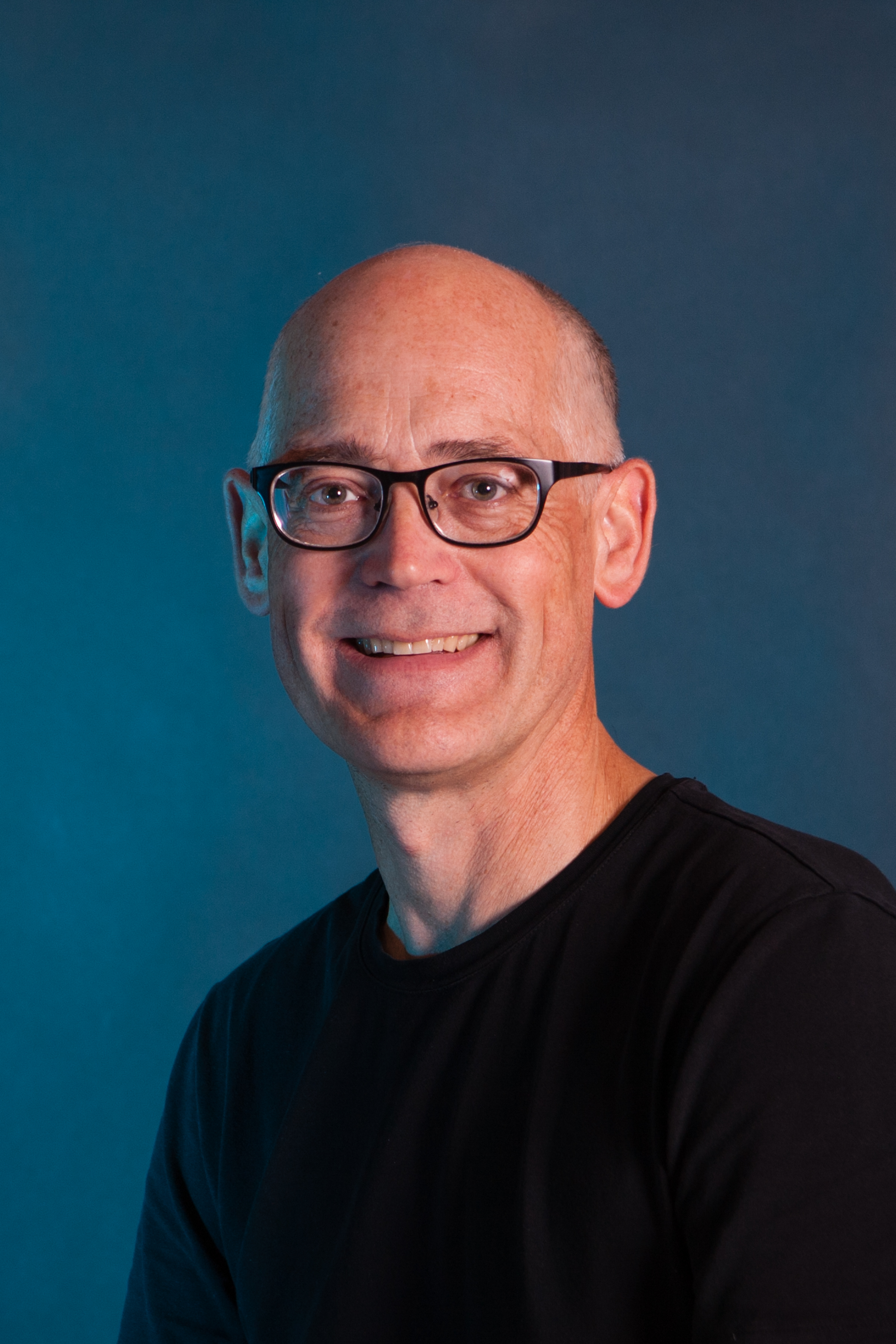
- Lange in 2016
- Born: Danny B. Lange; 1962 (age 63–64); Denmark
- Education: Technical University of Denmark (PhD)
- Employers: IBM; General Magic (1997–2002); Microsoft; Amazon Web Services; Uber (2015–2016); Unity Technologies (2016–2023); Google (2023–present)
- Spouse: Eva Moe
- Children: Yina Moe-Lange
- Website: dannylange.ai

Danny B. Lange (born 1962) is a Danish computer scientist who has worked on machine learning for IBM, Microsoft, Amazon Web Services, Uber, and Unity Technologies.

== Early life and education ==
Lange was born in Denmark. He earned his Doctor of Philosophy in computer science from the Technical University of Denmark.

== Career ==
During the 1990s, Lange worked at IBM Research – Tokyo, where he developed the Aglets software. From 1997 to 2002, he served as chief technology officer of General Magic, where he led the development of the company's Java agent platform, called Odyssey. He also led the design of General Motors' OnStar systems during the late 1990s.

Lange founded the startup company Vocomo Software in Cupertino, California in 2001. The company's VoiceXML technology and support staff were acquired by Voxeo in 2005. In addition to IBM, Lange has worked on machine learning for several companies, including Microsoft, Amazon Web Services (AWS), a subsidiary of Amazon, and Uber. He was principal architect at Microsoft's Startup Business Group, as of 2010. During his nearly two years at AWS, he managed the cloud computing provider's internal machine learning platform. He also led the launch of the Amazon Machine Learning product in his role as general manager.

Lange led Uber's machine learning team for more than a year, serving in the role of Head of Machine Learning starting in 2015. He managed developers in San Francisco and Seattle, and also worked within the company's autonomous car division. He served as Unity Technologies' vice-president of artificial intelligence and machine learning from late 2016 until 2023, where he led all efforts connected to the company's activities in these areas. At Unity he worked on artificial intelligence and machine learning for augmented and virtual reality. As of mid-2023, Danny Lange now serves as the Vice President of Business Intelligence and Artificial Intelligence (BI+AI) at Google.

In mid 2017, Lange joined the board of directors of the Danish visual effects company Spektral, which is developing machine learning-based chroma key technology. The company was acquired by Apple Inc. in 2018. He has invested in the Danish startup company Corti, which developed artificial intelligence for detecting cardiac arrest, and is a limited partner in byFounders, a Nordic venture capital firm.

== Personal life ==
Lange is married to Eva Moe. Their daughter, Yina Moe-Lange, competed as an alpine skier in the 2010 Winter Olympics. She was born in Tokyo in 1993. In addition to Japan, Lange and his family have lived in Silicon Valley and Sammamish, Washington.
