= Adam Foroughi =

American businessman

- Born: Sardasht, West Azerbaijan, Iran
- Education: University of California, Berkeley (BA)
- Occupation: Businessman
- Title: CEO of AppLovin
- Term: December 2011–present

Adam Foroughi is an Iranian-born American billionaire businessman and the chief executive officer (CEO) of AppLovin, a mobile technology company.

== Early life and education ==
Born in Sardasht, West Azerbaijan in 1980, Foroughi's family emigrated to the United States to escape the destruction caused by Iraq-Iran War. Adam grew up in Laguna Niguel, California, where his father Marty had a successful construction company. He attended Aliso Niguel High School and then went on to study at the University of California, Berkeley, earning a Bachelor of Arts in economics.

== Career ==
Upon graduating from Berkeley, Foroughi worked as a derivatives trader. Later, he founded two marketing companies before starting AppLovin.

In 2012, Foroughi co-founded AppLovin along with friends John Krystynak and Andrew Karam.

On April 15, 2021, AppLovin became a public company after an initial public offering (IPO), with a total valuation of approximately $24 billion. As a result of AppLovin's successful IPO, Foroughi's net worth rose to an estimated $2 billion.

In 2023, Foroughi's total compensation from AppLovin was $83.4 million making him the eighth highest paid CEO in the US that year.
