= Mobile Strike =

2015 video game

- Mobile Strike app icon
- Developer: Epic War
- Publisher: Machine Zone
- Platforms: Android, iOS, iPadOS
- Release: July 11, 2015
- Genre: Strategy
- Mode: Multiplayer

Mobile Strike is a freemium mobile massively multiplayer online strategy video game developed and published in 2015 by Machine Zone (now known as MZ). The game had a high-profile advertising campaign and became one of the top-grossing apps in 2015 and 2016.

== Marketing ==
Mobile Strike is well known for its advertising campaign featuring actor and former California governor Arnold Schwarzenegger as a commander. One of its commercials was featured on Super Bowl 50. Another commercial, which aired during Super Bowl LI, depicted Schwarzenegger saying memorable lines from his movie career, such as "I'm back", "Get to the chopper", and "Hasta la vista, baby".

In April 2017, one controversial advertisement featured plus sized women in bikinis, playing the game on sun loungers. The advertisement was later banned in the United Kingdom by the Advertising Standards Authority.

== Reception ==
As of November 2016, the app was the second highest-grossing game on Apple's App Store. However, the game itself was not well received by reviewers. Andrew Hayward of Macworld criticized the game for the overabundance of microtransactions. Hayward also criticized the game's advertising for emphasizing mechanics that are "greatly misrepresented for promotional purposes". Hayward concluded that the game is "surely not worth the hassle or payment needed to get to that point" and that, like its predecessor Game of War: Fire Age, "is a busywork simulator above all". Jennifer Allen of Gamezebo also criticized the game for being "busywork" and found the game's unlockables to be "soulless".
