= AppGratis =

Defunct app-discovery application

- Founded: 2008 (18 years ago) in San Francisco
- Dissolved: February 15, 2017; 9 years ago
- Headquarters: Paris, France
- Country of origin: United States
- Founder: Simon Dawlat
- Website: appgratis.com
- Current status: Defunct
- Native clients on: iOS, Android

AppGratis was an app-discovery application founded in 2008 by French engineer, Simon Dawlat. AppGratis curators found and recommended apps, which the apps were then featured to download for free or at a reduced price. In April 2013, AppGratis was removed from the Apple App Store for an alleged violation of App Store rules regarding third-party app promotion and marketing. On February 15, 2017, AppGratis was shut down and discontinued.

== History ==
AppGratis started as a newsletter listing daily app deals from the App Store for Apple users in 2008. The AppGratis mobile application was created in 2010 while still using the newsletter model. A team of publishers pick and review the quality of potential apps that want to be featured on the application. AppGratis was a bootstrapped company until January 2013, where AppGratis raised $13.5 million from Iris Capital and the Orange Publicis fund to expand the application on an international level. In February 2013, AppGratis passed the 10 million-user mark. Before its removal from the App Store, AppGratis had 12 million iOS users. A month after its removal from the Apple App Store, AppGratis launched the Android version of the application on Google Play. The Android version has obtained 1 million to 5 million downloads. On February 15, 2017, AppGratis shut down its business with a post for their users entitled 'Bye AppGratis'. In 2014, Simon Dawlat decided to shift to a new project, Batch.

=== Controversy with Apple store ===
In November 2012, Apple approved the AppGratis iPhone application. Days after receiving approval for the iPad application in 2013, Apple pulled the AppGratis application from the iOS App Store stating that the application violated clauses 2.25 and 5.6. AppGratis was under investigation whether the application worked to inflate app rankings in the App Store charts. The investigation of AppGratis incited French digital industry minister, Fleur Pellerin, to announce a call for closer regulation on the fairness and stability of digital distribution platforms. AppGratis protested its ban with a user petition, which gained close to a million signatures by May 2013.

== See also ==
- App Store Controversial Apps
