= DeltaDNA =

UK game analytics and personalization company

deltaDNA (formerly Games Analytics) is a game analytics and personalization company founded in 2011 in Edinburgh, Scotland as Games Analytics, it rebranded in 2014, as deltaDNA. The company develops and markets an analytics and marketing platform for games that are primarily in the free-to-play market, and offers consultation services for game developers and publishers. The platform can be used to segment players based on their behaviour and ability, and then to augment their game experience. Real-time data collection and interactive analysis of the data is made possible by utilizing the VoltDB NewSQL relational database.

== History ==
In November 2014, deltaDNA received $3 million in Series A second round equity funding from Par Equity, STV Group plc and the Scottish Investment Bank, who were existing investors, and from new strategic investor Edge Performance VCT. This has taken the total funding granted to $5 million to date. The company opened an office in San Francisco in January 2015.

At the 2014 Digital Technology Awards in Scotland, deltaDNA won the Best New Product or Service Award.

In September 2019, deltaDNA was acquired by Unity Technologies.

== Additional services ==
=== Academic ===
In November 2014, deltaDNA launched a free academic licence in partnership with Abertay University, Dundee, available to both undergraduate and post graduate games courses

=== Benchmark ===
deltaDNA launched Benchmark in February 2014, a consultation service to provide practical guidance for developers working on free-to-play games. The service involves assessing each title across 75 different categories, such as engagement, retention and monetization
