= Machine Zone =

American video game company

Machine Zone Inc.
- Trade name: MZ
- Formerly: Addmired (2008–2012)
- Type: Subsidiary of Tripledot Studios
- Industry: Mobile gaming software; Real-time computing; Cloud-based networking
- Founded: 2008
- Founder: Gabriel Leydon; Halbert Nakagawa; Mike Sherrill
- Headquarters: Palo Alto, California, United States
- Area served: Worldwide
- Key people: Kristen Dumont, CEO
- Products: Game of War: Fire Age (2012); Mobile Strike (2015); Final Fantasy XV: A New Empire (2017); Final Fantasy XV: War for Eos; World War Rising (2018)
- Owner: Tripledot Studios
- Number of employees: 550 (as of October 2015)
- Divisions: Platform
- Subsidiaries: Epic War LLC; Epic Action LLC
- Website: mz.com

Machine Zone, Inc. (MZ) is an American technology company founded in 2008 and based in Palo Alto, California. It is best known for its widely advertised freemium mobile MMO strategy games Game of War: Fire Age and Mobile Strike, which have both simultaneously been ranked among the top ten highest-grossing mobile games.

On July 1, 2025, MZ was one of the AppLovin gaming studios sold by the company to Tripledot Studios.

== History ==
=== Origin and first products (2008–2012) ===
The company, which was originally called Addmired, was founded in 2008. In 2012, Addmired changed its name to Machine Zone, after raising $8 million in funding from Menlo Ventures. Gabriel Leydon founded the company with partners Mike Sherrill and current Chief Technology Officer Halbert Nakagawa. It was among the participants in Y Combinator's Winter 2008 Accelerator program for startups.

The company got its start making AddHer and AddHim, a pair of MySpace widgets that TechCrunch called "a Hot or Not-esque social network plugin." Addmired later pivoted into the free-to-play game space, releasing 13 games between 2009 and 2012, including the iOS games Original Gangstaz, iMob and iMob 2, and Global War Riot.

=== Breakout games (2012–2015) ===
Machine Zone released Game of War: Fire Age in October 2012 in New Zealand and Australia. According to VentureBeat, Leydon had used the 2012 venture funding to "bet everything on Game of War," putting a team of 80 people on an 18-month project to design and build a complex real-time strategy game, including creation of a messaging infrastructure and language translation layer that would allow worldwide participation in the game's alliances and chat.

The company launched Mobile Strike, a modern warfare game, in November 2015. In an advertising campaign that featured Arnold Schwarzenegger, the game was marketed as a product of a company called Epic War, later revealed to be a development studio of Machine Zone.

=== Rebranding (2016–2017) ===
The company rebranded itself as MZ in 2016. That year, a funding round valued the company at $5 billion.

In April 2016, simultaneously with rebranding itself as MZ, the company announced the launch of a new platform as a service, leveraging the cloud-based networking infrastructure of its real-time gaming platform. Using the existing technology developed to monitor hundreds of thousands of players in its real-time mobile games, the company developed and demonstrated a system for the government of New Zealand that included applications to view and manage public transportation more efficiently, including an ability to provide timely information, down to the second, on bus and train movements.

In November 2016, Machine Zone announced that it was partnering with Square Enix to develop a Final Fantasy XV mobile MMO. Through a subsidiary company, Epic Action LLC, Machine Zone released Final Fantasy XV: A New Empire in June 2017.

=== Refocus on gaming (2018–present) ===
In June 2018, MZ's board of directors replaced founder and CEO Gabe Leydon in order to refocus the company on gaming. Leydon had announced in March 2018 that MZ was working with Hedera Hashgraph on a distributed cryptocurrency technology called hashgraph, a blockchain alternative. According to Fast Company, Leydon left the company "ostensibly to run Satori", part of MZ's platform business since early 2017, as a spinoff "standalone business" focusing on the hashgraph project.

Kristen Dumont, an attorney who had been the company's chief operating officer since 2015, replaced Leydon as CEO. In a July 2018 restructuring, Dumont laid off a large portion of Machine Zone's marketing team, approximately 125 jobs.

In October 2018, TechCrunch named the company the sixth most successful company from Y Combinator. By the end of that year, after hiring Dan Nash as its chief financial officer, MZ had raised around $720 million in a new round of funding, with investors including JP Morgan, Anthos Capital, and Menlo Ventures.

MZ released one game in 2018, World War Rising. Described by Pocket Gamer as "effectively a reskin of the developer's previously successful 4X strategy games", the new title offered a military-themed interface depicting armies from World War I to the modern era. The game, which was reportedly "stealthily launched" sometime before the end of August 2018, was identified as a product of Mobile War LLC rather than MZ. While Dumont confirmed MZ's ownership of the game during a tech conference in November 2018, World War Rising did not appear on MZ's website until at least May 2019.

In March 2020, MZ published 'CrystalBorne', and in May was acquired by publishing-platform company AppLovin for approximately $500 million, which represented a large decline in value and a loss for many investors.

== Marketing ==
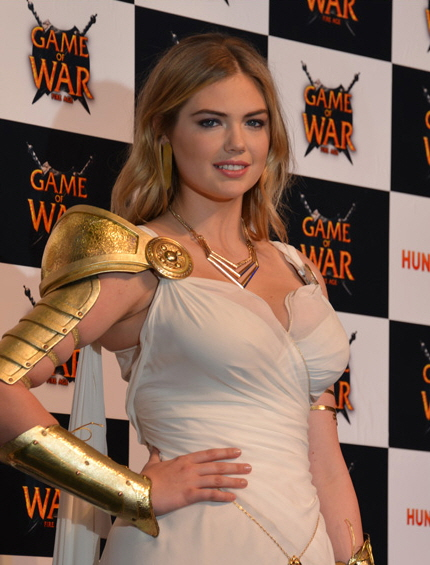
Kate Upton in 2014, promoting Game of War in costume as Athena.

Approximately $40 million was spent on marketing Game of War: Fire Age in 2014. Along with advertisements in digital and social media, television commercials were produced featuring model Kate Upton as the goddess Athena. The ads highlighted Upton's sex appeal as she led battles in fantasy settings that were compared to those in Game of Thrones. The spots were introduced in the United States during an NFL Thursday Night Football game and were aired prominently during Super Bowl games and other sports events.

Singer Mariah Carey replaced Upton, in late 2015, as the face of the game's advertising campaign. In September 2015, the first commercial featuring a brief clip of Carey as Athena was previewed by TMZ. Carey's agreement reportedly included "a seven-figure pay check; a 30-second commercial filmed by Alan Taylor ... and the use of her music in future promotional material."

In February 2016, MZ spent an estimated three times more on television advertising than any other mobile gaming company, including spending an estimated $10.7 million on 3,265 airings of its Super Bowl 50 ad for Mobile Strike featuring Arnold Schwarzenegger.

CEO Kristin Dumont, in a November 2018 interview with Fast Company, signaled a change in marketing strategy that would be unlikely to include future Super Bowl advertising. Dumont stated a preference for marketing with "more measurable results", and called television advertising "kind of a rip-off, to be honest".

== Game revenue and player purchases ==
In August 2015, a former employee of Machine Zone was arrested and charged with stealing proprietary data that included "player spending habits broken down by time, location, age and other characteristics" which showed, for example, "which in-game items generate the most revenue and where in the game players often quit." The monetary value of the data was linked by the Wall Street Journal to the fact that "about 3% of mobile-game players buy virtual goodies, such as extra turns and special powers. Most spend only a few dollars a month, while a tiny fraction known as whales – a name derived from casinos – plunk down $50 or more a month."

Analytics by Slice Intelligence indicated that Game of War's paying players each spent an average of $550 in 2015 on its in-app purchases, compared to $87 spent by the average player of mobile free-to-play games. In March 2017, the company defeated a class action lawsuit on the basis that players who had sought damages for lost "virtual gold" at a virtual casino in Game of War "did not lose real money", according to the court.

In October 2024, Machine Zone (MZ) announced the end of life for War for Eos.

== Products ==
- Game of War: Fire Age (2012)
- Mobile Strike (2015)
- Final Fantasy XV: A New Empire (2017)
- World War Rising (2018)
- Final Fantasy XV: War for Eos
