= App Store (Apple) =

Mobile app distribution platform by Apple

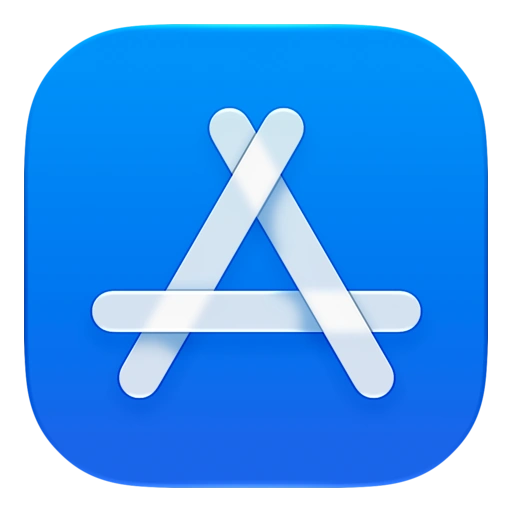
- Developer: Apple
- Release: July 10, 2008; 18 years ago
- Operating system: iOS, macOS, iPadOS, watchOS, tvOS, and visionOS
- Type: Digital distribution and software update
- Website: appstore.com

The App Store is an app marketplace developed and maintained by Apple, for mobile apps and desktop apps on its iOS, macOS and iPadOS operating systems. The store allows users to browse and download approved apps developed within Apple's iOS SDK. Apps can be downloaded on the iPhone, iPod Touch, or iPad, and some can be transferred to the Apple Watch smartwatch or 4th-generation or newer Apple TVs as extensions of iPhone apps.

The App Store opened on July 10, 2008, with an initial 500 applications available. The number of apps peaked at around 2.2 million in 2017, but declined slightly over the next few years as Apple began a process to remove old or 32-bit apps. As of 2024, the store features more than 1.9 million apps.

While Apple touts the role of the App Store in creating new jobs in the "app economy" and as of 2023 claims to have paid over $320 billion to developers, the App Store has also attracted criticism from developers and government regulators that it operates a monopoly and that Apple's 30% cut of revenues from the store is excessive. In October 2021, the Netherlands Authority for Consumers and Markets (ACM) concluded that in-app commissions from Apple's App Store are anti-competitive and would demand that Apple change its in-app payment system policies.

== History ==
Download on the App Store badge as of 2017

While originally developing the iPhone prior to its unveiling in 2007, Apple CEO Steve Jobs did not intend to let third-party developers build native apps for iOS, instead directing them to make web applications for the Safari web browser. However, backlash from developers prompted the company to reconsider, with Jobs announcing in October 2007 that Apple would have a software development kit available for developers by February 2008. The SDK was released on March 6, 2008. Before the official availability of the App Store, users could install third party apps only after a jailbreak of the device. Tutorials explained how to easily perform the jailbreak, and this made it possible for developers to distribute both free apps, ringtones and games but also the first paid applications for iPhone, like the Navizon app, to let users get their real time location even without a proper GPS module, which became available as a paid app on iPhone in September 2007, almost one year before the official launch of the iPhone App Store.

The iPhone App Store opened on July 10, 2008. On July 11, the iPhone 3G was released and came pre-loaded with support for App Store.

iBeer was one of the earliest successful apps on the App Store. The app allows users to pretend to drink a beer with their iPhones. The App Store's early landscape allowed such apps to succeed, with the creators reporting that they made $10,000 to $20,000 a day.

Initially, apps could be free or paid, but then in 2009, Apple added the ability to add in-app purchases which quickly became the dominant way to monetize apps, especially games.

After the success of Apple's App Store and the launch of similar services by its competitors, the term "app store" has been adopted to refer to any similar service for mobile devices. However, Apple applied for a U.S. trademark on the term "App Store" in 2008, which was tentatively approved in early 2011. In June 2011, U.S. District Judge Phyllis Hamilton, who was presiding over Apple's case against Amazon, said she would "probably" deny Apple's motion to stop Amazon from using the "App Store" name. In July, Apple was denied preliminary injunction against Amazon's Appstore by a federal judge.

The term app has become a popular buzzword; in January 2011, app was awarded the honor of being 2010's "Word of the Year" by the American Dialect Society. "App" has been used as shorthand for "application" since at least the late 1970s, and in product names since at least 2006, for example, then-named Google Apps.

Apple announced Mac App Store, a similar app distribution platform for its macOS personal computer operating system, in October 2010, with the official launch taking place in January 2011 with the release of its 10.6.6 "Snow Leopard" update.

In February 2013, Apple informed developers that they could begin using appstore.com for links to their apps. In June at its developer conference, Apple announced an upcoming "Kids" section in App Store, a new section featuring apps categorized by age range, and the section was launched alongside the release of iOS 7 in September 2013.

In 2016, multiple media outlets reported that apps had decreased significantly in popularity. Recode wrote that "The app boom is over", an editorial in TechCrunch stated that "The air of hopelessness that surrounds the mobile app ecosystem is obvious and demoralizing", and The Verge wrote that "the original App Store model of selling apps for a buck or two looks antiquated". Issues included consumer "boredom", a lack of app discoverability, and, as stated by a report from 2014, a lack of new app downloads among smartphone users.

In October 2016, in an effort to improve app discoverability, Apple rolled out the ability for developers to purchase advertising spots in App Store to users in the United States. The ads, shown at the top of the search results, are based strictly on relevant keywords, and are not used to create profiles on users. Apple expanded search ads to the United Kingdom, Australia and New Zealand in April 2017, along with more configurable advertising settings for developers. Search ads were expanded to Canada, Mexico and Switzerland in October 2017. In December 2017, Apple revamped its search ads program to offer two distinctive versions; "Search Ads Basic" is a pay-per-install program aimed at smaller developers, in which they only pay when users actually install their app. Search Ads Basic also features an easier setup process and a restricted monthly budget. "Search Ads Advanced" is a new name given to the older method, in which developers have to pay whenever users tap on their apps in search results, along with unlimited monthly budgets. .

In January 2017, reports surfaced that documentation for a new beta for the then-upcoming release of iOS 10.3 detailed that Apple would let developers respond to customer reviews in the App Store, marking a significant change from the previous limitation, which prevented developers from communicating with users. The functionality was officially enabled on March 27, 2017 when iOS 10.3 was released to users.

Apple also offered an iTunes Affiliate Program, which lets people refer others to apps and other iTunes content, along with in-app purchases, for a percentage of sales. The commission rate for in-app purchases was reduced from 7% to 2.5% in May 2017 and discontinued completely in 2018.

In September 2017, App Store received a major design overhaul with the release of iOS 11. The new design features a greater focus on editorial content and daily highlights, and introduces a "cleaner and more consistent and colorful look," similar to several of Apple's built-in iOS apps.

Prior to September 2017, Apple offered a way for users to manage their iOS app purchases through the iTunes computer software. In September, version 12.7 of iTunes was released, removing the App Store section in the process. However, the following month, iTunes 12.6.3 was also released, retaining the App Store, with 9to5Mac noting that the secondary release was positioned by Apple as "necessary for some businesses performing internal app deployments".

In December 2017, Apple announced that developers could offer applications for pre-order, letting them make apps visible in the store between 2–90 days ahead of release.

On January 4, 2018, Apple announced that the App Store had a record-breaking holiday season according to a new press release. During the week starting on Christmas Eve, a record number of customers made App Store purchases, spending more than $890 million in that seven-day period. On New Year's Day 2018 alone, customers made $300 million in purchases.

In September 2019, Apple launched Apple Arcade, a subscription service for video games within the App Store.

In March 2020, Apple made "Sign in with Apple" mandatory for any apps that use third party logins (such as signing in with a Google account). As part of the new App Store guidelines, the deadline for developers to implement the feature was April 30.

In 2019 and 2020, Apple was frequently criticized by other companies such as Spotify, Airbnb and Hey and regulators for potentially running the App Store as a monopoly and overcharging developers, and was the target of lawsuits and investigations in the EU and United States. A conflict between Epic Games, the creator of the Fortnite game, and Apple, led to the lawsuit Epic Games v. Apple. In December 2020, Apple announced that they would introduce a "Small Business Program" which lowers Apple's revenue cut for app developers making less than USD 1 million per year from 30% to 15%. Additionally, governments such as in China, India and Russia have increasingly required Apple to remove specific apps, with the threatened removal of some apps often becoming part of geopolitical feuds. In January 2022, Apple added support for unlisted apps to the App Store. These apps can only be downloaded via direct links, and do not appear as search results. Later in December 2022, a report by Bloomberg noted that the company had begun making preparations for opening up sideloading and alternative app stores on iOS, as compliance with the EU's Digital Markets Act that had passed in September of that year. The same report also noted Apple planned to open up the NFC and camera systems on iOS, and the Find My network to AirTag competitors like Tile.

Following a European Commission antitrust investigation, on January 25, 2024, Apple allowed game streaming apps and services, such as Xbox Cloud Streaming and GeForce Now, on the App Store. Apple also allowed iPhone users in the European Union to use third-party app stores and browser engines.

In the Epic Games v. Apple lawsuit, a 2021 court ruling forced Apple to allow developers to include external payment links in apps, which Apple initially complied with by adding a 27% commission and restrictive warnings. In April 2025, the court ruled Apple violated the injunction, ordering the removal of all commissions and restrictions on external payment links. Apple appealed the decision but complied by May 2025, allowing apps like Fortnite to return with unrestricted payment options. The appeal remains ongoing as of August 2025.

In November 2025, Apple launched a web interface at apps.apple.com, allowing users to browse and search for apps written for iPhone, iPad, Mac, Apple Vision Pro, Apple Watch, Apple TV in a web browser, in addition to the existing native apps on those devices.

== Development and monetization ==
=== iOS SDK ===
The iOS SDK (Software development kit) allows for the development of mobile apps on iOS. It is a free download for users of Mac personal computers. It is not available for Microsoft Windows PCs. The SDK contains sets giving developers access to various functions and services of iOS devices, such as hardware and software attributes. It also contains an iPhone simulator to mimic the look and feel of the device on the computer while developing. New versions of the SDK accompany new versions of iOS. In order to test applications, get technical support, and distribute apps through App Store, developers are required to subscribe to the Apple Developer Program.

Combined with Xcode, the iOS SDK helps developers write iOS apps using officially supported programming languages, including Swift and Objective-C. Other companies have also created tools that allow for the development of native iOS apps using their respective programming languages.

=== Monetization ===
To publish apps on App Store, developers must pay a $99 yearly fee for access to Apple's Developer Program. Apple announced that, in the United States starting in 2018, it would waive the fee for nonprofit organizations and governments. Fee waivers have, since 2020, been extended to non-profits, educational organizations and governments in additional countries.

Developers have a few options for monetizing their applications. The "Free Model" enables free apps, increasing likelihood of engagement. The "Freemium Model" makes the app download free, but users are offered optional additional features in-app that require payments. The "Subscription Model" enables ongoing monetization through renewable transactions. The "Paid Model" makes the app itself a paid download and offers no additional features. Less frequently, the "Paymium Model" has both a paid app downloads and paid in-app content.

In-app subscriptions were originally introduced for magazines, newspapers and music apps in February 2011, giving developers 70% of revenue earned and Apple 30%. Publishers could also sell digital subscriptions through their website, bypassing Apple's fees, but were not allowed to advertise their website alternative through the apps themselves.

In an interview with The Verge in June 2016, Phil Schiller, Apple's senior vice president of Worldwide Marketing, said that Apple had a "renewed focus and energy" on the App Store, and announced multiple significant changes, including advertisements in search results and a new app subscription model. The subscription model saw the firmly established 70/30 revenue split between developers and Apple change into a new 85/15 revenue split if a user stays subscribed to the developer's app for a year, and opens the possibility of subscriptions to all apps, not just select categories.

App data and insights analyst company App Annie released a report in October 2016, announcing that China had overtaken the United States as Apple's biggest market in App Store revenue. In the third quarter of 2016, Chinese users spent $1.7 billion vs. approximately $1.5 billion by American users.

In June 2017, Apple announced that App Store had generated over $70 billion in revenue for developers since its 2008 launch. By 2020, this had increased to $155 billion, and by 2023 to $ 320 billion. In 2024 the Apple App Store generated a total of $1.3 trillion in sales.

=== tvOS apps ===
The App Store is also available on tvOS, the operating system for the Apple TV. It was announced on September 9, 2015, at the Apple September 2015 event, alongside the 4th generation Apple TV.

tvOS ships with development tools for developers. tvOS adds support for an SDK for developers to build apps for the TV including all of the APIs included in iOS 9 such as Metal. It also adds an which allows users to browse, download, and install a wide variety of applications. In addition, developers can now use their own interface inside of their application rather than only being able to use Apple's interface. Since tvOS is based on iOS, it is easy to port existing iOS apps to the Apple TV with Xcode while making only a few refinements to the app to better suit the larger screen. Apple provides Xcode free of charge to all registered Apple developers. To develop for the new Apple TV, it is necessary to make a parallax image for the application icon. In order to do this, Apple provides a Parallax exporter and previewer in the development tools for the Apple TV.

== Number of iOS applications ==
On July 10, 2008, Apple's then-CEO Steve Jobs told USA Today that App Store contained 500 third-party applications for the iPhone and the iPod Touch, and of these 125 were free. Ten million downloads were recorded in the first weekend. By September, the number of available apps had increased to 3,000, with over 100 million downloads.

Over the years, the store has surpassed multiple major milestones, including 50,000, 100,000, 250,000, 500,000, 1 million, and 2 million apps. The billionth application was downloaded on April 24, 2009.

The number of apps on the app store shrank for the first time in 2017 as Apple began to remove older apps which did not comply with current app guidelines and technologies. As of 2020, it was estimated to house around 1.8 million apps, and as of 2024 Apple reported a total of more than 1.9 million apps available on the App Store.

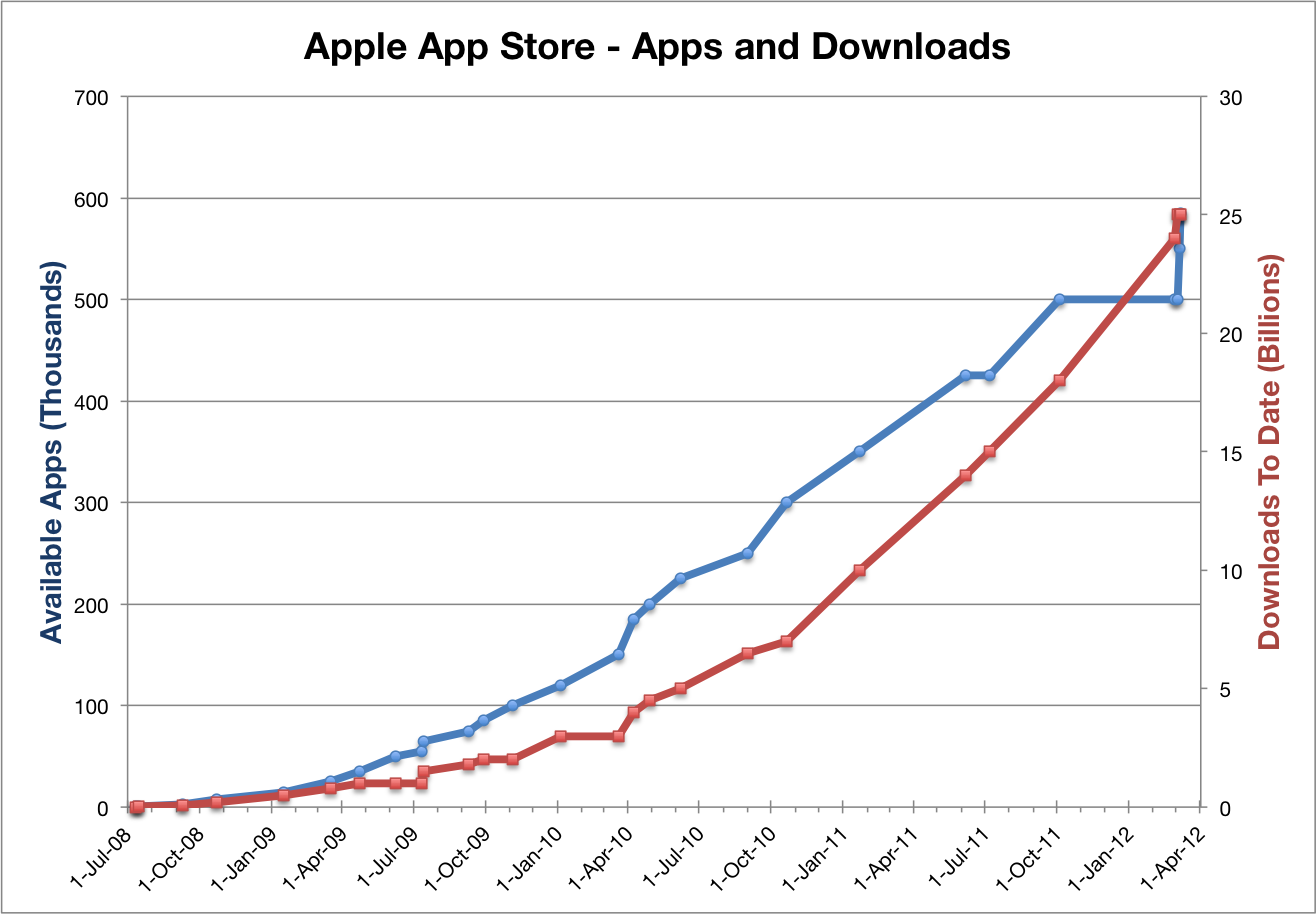
App Store app availability has increased in line with downloads over time.

Date	Available apps	Downloads to date
July 11, 2008	500	0
July 14, 2008	800	10,000,000
September 9, 2008	3,000	100,000,000
January 16, 2009	15,000	500,000,000
March 17, 2009	25,000	800,000,000
April 24, 2009	35,000	1,000,000,000
June 8, 2009	50,000	1,000,000,000+
July 14, 2009	50,000	1,500,000,000
September 28, 2009	85,000	2,000,000,000
November 4, 2009	100,000	2,000,000,000+
January 5, 2010	140,000+	3,000,000,000+
February 12, 2010	150,000+	3,000,000,000+
June 7, 2010	225,000+	5,000,000,000+
August 28, 2010	250,000+	5,000,000,000+
September 1, 2010	250,000+	6,500,000,000
October 20, 2010	300,000	7,000,000,000
January 22, 2011	350,000+	10,000,000,000+
July 7, 2011	425,000+	15,000,000,000+
October 4, 2011	500,000+	18,000,000,000+
March 2, 2012	500,000+	25,000,000,000
June 11, 2012	650,000+	30,000,000,000+
September 12, 2012	700,000+	30,000,000,000+
January 7, 2013	775,000+	40,000,000,000+
January 28, 2013	800,000+	40,000,000,000+
April 24, 2013	800,000+	45,000,000,000+
May 16, 2013	850,000+	50,000,000,000+
June 10, 2013	900,000+	50,000,000,000+
October 22, 2013	1,000,000+	60,000,000,000+
June 2, 2014	1,200,000+	75,000,000,000+
September 9, 2014	1,300,000+	75,000,000,000+
January 8, 2015	1,400,000+	75,000,000,000+
June 8, 2015	1,500,000+	100,000,000,000+
June 13, 2016	2,000,000+	130,000,000,000+
January 5, 2017	2,200,000	130,000,000,000+
2020	~1,800,000	
2024	1,961,596	

=== Number of iPad applications ===
The iPad was released in April 2010, with approximately 3,000 apps available. By July 2011, 16 months after the release, there were over 100,000 apps available designed specifically for the device.

Date	Number of native iPad apps
April 2010	3,000
January 2011	60,000
July 2011	100,000
November 2011	140,000
January 7, 2013	300,000+
October 22, 2013	475,000
February 25, 2015	725,000+
March 21, 2016	1 million

== Most downloaded apps ==
=== Yearly ===
Apple publishes a list on a yearly basis, giving credit to the apps with the highest number of downloads in the past year.

Most popular iOS apps each year
Rank	2015	2016	2017	2018	2019	2020	2021	2024
1	Trivia Crack	Snapchat	Bitmoji	YouTube	YouTube	ZOOM Cloud Meetings	TikTok	Temu
2	Messenger	Messenger	Snapchat	Instagram	Instagram	TikTok	Instagram	Threads
3	Dubsmash	Pokémon Go	YouTube	Snapchat	Snapchat	Disney+	Facebook	TikTok
4	Instagram	Instagram	Messenger	Messenger	TikTok	YouTube	WhatsApp	ChatGPT
5	Snapchat	Facebook	Instagram	Facebook	Messenger	Instagram	Telegram	Google
6	YouTube	YouTube	Facebook	Bitmoji	Gmail	Facebook	Snapchat	Instagram
7	Facebook	Google Maps	Google Maps	Netflix	Netflix	Snapchat	Zoom	WhatsApp
8	Uber	Pandora Music	Netflix	Google Maps	Facebook	Messenger	Messenger	CapCut
9	Crossy Road	Netflix	Spotify	Gmail	Google Maps	Gmail	CapCut	YouTube
10	Google Maps	Spotify	Uber	Spotify	Amazon	CashApp	Spotify	Gmail

Most popular iOS games each year
Rank	2015	2016	2017	2018	2019	2020 (Free games only)	2024 (Free games only)
1	Trivia Crack	Pokémon Go	Super Mario Run	Fortnite	Mario Kart Tour	Among Us	Block Blast
2	Crossy Road	Not Published	8 Ball Pool	Helix Jump	Color Bump 3D	Call of Duty: Mobile	MONOPOLY GO!
3	Not Published	Not Published	Snake vs. Block	Rise Up	aquapark.io	Roblox	Roblox
4	Not Published	Not Published	Ballz	PUBG Mobile	Call of Duty: Mobile	Subway Surfers	Call of Duty: Warzone
5	Not Published	Not Published	Word Cookies!	Hole.io	BitLife	Ink Inc. - Tattoo Drawing	Township
6	Not Published	Not Published	Subway Surfers	Love Balls	Polysphere	Magic Tiles 3	Last War: Survival
7	Not Published	Not Published	Episode	Snake vs. Block	Wordscapes	Brain Test: Tricky Puzzles	Royal Match
8	Not Published	Not Published	Rolling Sky	Rules of Survival	Fortnite	Brain Out - Tricky Riddle Games	Brawl Stars
9	Not Published	Not Published	Block! Hexa Puzzle	Roblox	Roller Splat	Coin Master	Subway Surfers
10	Not Published	Not Published	Paper.io	Dune!	AMAZE!!!	Woodturning 3D	My Perfect Hotel

=== Of all time ===
These are the most downloaded iOS applications and the highest revenue-generating iOS applications of all time.

Most installed iOS apps of all time (2010-2018)
Rank	Games
1	Candy Crush Saga
2	Subway Surfers
3	Fruit Ninja
4	Clash of Clans
5	Honor of Kings
6	Minion Rush
7	Angry Birds
8	Temple Run 2
9	Temple Run
10	Asphalt 8: Airborne

Most installed iOS apps of all time (until 2025)
Rank	App
1	WhatsApp
2	Facebook
3	Instagram
4	Messenger
5	TikTok
6	Snapchat
7	YouTube
8	Telegram
9	Twitter (X)
10	Netflix

Highest-grossing iOS apps and games of all time (2010-2018)
Rank	Apps	Games
1	Netflix	Clash of Clans
2	Spotify	Candy Crush Saga
3	Pandora	Monster Strike
4	Tencent Video	Puzzle & Dragons
5	Tinder	Honor of Kings
6	Line	Fantasy Westward Journey
7	iQIYI	Game of War: Fire Age
8	HBO Now	Fate/Grand Order
9	Kwai	Clash Royale
10	QQ	Pokémon Go

== Mac App Store ==
Mac App Store
- macOS App Store icon used in macOS Tahoe

- Front page of the macOS version of the App Store
- Developer: Apple
- Release: January 6, 2011; 15 years ago
- Operating system: macOS
- Type: Digital distribution and software update
- Website: apple.com/app-store

The Mac App Store (also known as the App Store) is a digital distribution platform for macOS apps, often referred to as Mac apps, created and maintained by Apple. The platform was announced on October 20, 2010, at Apple's "Back to the Mac" event. Apple began accepting app submissions from registered developers on November 3, 2010, in preparation for its launch.

The Mac App Store was launched on January 6, 2011, as part of the free Mac OS X 10.6.6 update for all current Snow Leopard users. After 24 hours of release, Apple announced that there were over one million downloads.

=== Regulations ===
Like the App Store on iOS and iPadOS, the Mac App Store is regulated by Apple.

To submit an app for consideration, the developer must be a member of the Apple Developer Program. As of March 2023, the membership fee is US$99 a year.

Apps must be approved by Apple before becoming available on the store. Disallowed types of apps revealed by Apple include apps that:

- change the native user interface elements or behaviors of macOS.
- do not comply with Apple Macintosh Human Interface Guidelines.
- are similar in look or function to current Apple products (e.g. the Mac App Store itself, Finder, iTunes, and iChat).
- are similar to other apps that are already present in the Mac App Store (e.g. Adobe Illustrator and CorelDraw, Adobe Photoshop, Adobe Lightroom and Apple Aperture, Cinema 4D and Autodesk 3D Max).
- contain or display pornographic material.
- are or install shared components (kernel extensions, browser plugins, QuickTime components, etc.).
- provide contents or services that expire.
- do not run on the currently shipping version of macOS.
- are beta, demo, trial, or test versions of software.
- reference trademarks for which the developer does not have explicit use permission.
- are free software licensed only under GPL (because the App Store Terms of Service imposes additional restrictions incompatible with the GPL).
- use software libraries that are either optionally installed or deemed deprecated by Apple for macOS users. Examples given:
  - Apple's implementation of Java SE 6 (although the OpenJDK implementation of Java SE 7 is permitted if bundled into the app).
  - PowerPC code requiring Rosetta.
- are not sandboxed (as of June 1, 2012). At WWDC 2013, Apple announced that this rule no longer applied, and that so-called "temporary exceptions" may be used when the app has a reason not to be sandboxed.
- are not 64-bit apps (as of January 1, 2018)
- contain malicious code.

As with the iOS and iPadOS App Store, Apple rates applications worldwide based on their content, and determines the age group for which each is appropriate. macOS will allow blocking of objectionable apps in System Settings.

=== Usage by Apple ===
Since the opening of the Mac App Store, Apple has increasingly used it as the primary means of distribution of its own in-house software products at the expense of boxed versions being sold at its retail stores. This position was increased with the July 2011 release of OS X Lion, which was the first release of OS X not sold in the form of DVD boxes. This method limited the reach of distribution of the operating system to those who currently use Mac OS X 10.6.6+, although other means offered by Apple after the release included a USB flash drive containing the operating system and a digital in-store download of the operating system through Apple Store locations. Starting from OS X Mountain Lion, Apple's operating systems can only be downloaded from the Mac App Store.

This has also affected Apple's prior means of distribution through its own website, with the Downloads gallery being removed in July 2011 and replaced with links to the Mac App Store information page. However, it has not affected the Dashboard widget gallery, nor has it affected the Safari Extensions gallery, both of which remain online and web-based (however, in Safari 12, the old type of extensions were deprecated and replaced by a newer type, available exclusively on the Mac App Store). Apple Support Download section also remains online, as it provides mostly security updates for current and older software applications and operating systems, many dating back to before 1998.

=== Counterfeit apps ===
Not long after independent game developer Wolfire Games placed its game, Lugaru, on the Mac App Store, as Lugaru HD for $9.99, the developer noticed a counterfeit copy of their game also being sold on the App Store for US$0.99. The developer contacted Apple on January 31, 2011, and on February 10, 2011, the counterfeit copy of the game was removed from the App Store.

A number of news sites have remarked that for all the scrutiny Apple places on apps listed in their store, a counterfeit copy of an existing app should not have made it through the process, and the days it had been since the developer had alerted Apple to the counterfeit software is disconcerting to developers.

=== History ===
The Mac App Store launched with over 1,000 apps on January 6, 2011, including Apple's own iWork '09, iLife '11, Aperture, and third-party applications ported from iOS, such as Angry Birds, Flight Control, Things and Twitter for Mac. Most of the apps belonged to the Games category, which had nearly three times as many apps in the next largest category, Utilities. The most common price point was $20–50. Angry Birds, a popular video game on iOS App Store, was the number one paid app on the Mac App Store on the first day.

An update to the Mac App Store for OS X Mountain Lion introduced an Easter egg in which, if one downloads an app from the Mac App Store and goes to one's app folder before the app has finished downloading, one will see the app's timestamp as "January 24, 1984, at 2:00 AM," the date the original Macintosh went on sale. This is the first time an Easter egg has appeared in a piece of Apple software since Steve Jobs had declared a ban on Easter eggs when he returned to Apple in 1997.

On November 11, 2015, a number of apps purchased through the Mac App Store began to fail at launch. Users worldwide got error messages and were forced to delete and re-download affected apps. It was discovered the next day by Tapbots developer Paul Haddad that the issue had to do with an expired security certificate. On November 17, Apple sent an email with explanations to developers. The company stated that most of the issues were resolved and that troubleshooting information was provided to the AppleCare support team.

On December 17, 2015, responsibility for overseeing App Store was given to Phil Schiller, Apple's senior vice president of Worldwide Marketing. Previously App Store was led by Eddy Cue, Apple's senior vice president of Internet Software and Services.

On January 1, 2018, Apple announced it was no longer accepting 32-bit apps on the Mac App Store, while existing 32-bit apps on the App Store must be updated to fit the 64-bit architecture by June 1, 2018.

On June 4, 2018, Apple announced that a new version of the App Store would be included in macOS Mojave based on the redesigned App Store introduced in iOS 11. This included new Create, Work, Play and Develop categories for apps, and a Discover tab curated by Apple's editors.

The Mac App Store began distributing universal apps that run on both Intel x86-64 processors and Apple silicon ARM64 systems-on-a-chip in 2020, following the release of macOS Big Sur. After the release of macOS Monterey in 2021, Apple allowed new apps to be compiled only for Apple silicon Macs, but required existing universal apps to maintain Intel support. On September 1, 2026, Apple allowed developers of universal apps to drop support for Intel Macs.

== Application ratings ==
Apple rates applications worldwide based on their content, and determines the age group for which each is appropriate. According to the iPhone OS 3.0 launch event, the iPhone allows blocking of objectionable apps in the iPhone's settings. The rating system received an overhaul for iOS 26 in 2025. The following are the ratings that Apple has detailed:

=== Current ===
Symbol	Rating	Description
	4+	Contains no objectionable material. This rating has three sub-classifications for children's apps: Made for Ages 5 and Under – Intended for children aged 5 and under, but people aged 6 and over can also use this app.; Made for Ages 6 to 8 – Intended for children aged 6 to 8, but people aged 9 and over and 5 and under can also use this app.; Made for Ages 9 to 11 – Intended for children aged 9 to 11, but people aged 12 and over and 8 and under can also use this app.
	9+	May contain mild or infrequent occurrences of cartoon, fantasy or realistic violence, and mild or infrequent mature, suggestive, or horror-themed content which may not be suitable for children under the age of 9.
	13+	May contain frequent or intense cartoon or fantasy violence, infrequent realistic violence, mild or infrequent sexual content, mild or infrequent drug use or references, frequent profanity, and simulated gambling which may not be suitable for children under the age of 13.
	16+	May contain unrestricted web access, frequent medical information, and frequent mature or suggestive themes which may not be suitable for children under the age of 16.
	18+	May contain frequent drug use, frequent sexual content or nudity, frequent or intense realistic violence, and frequent simulated gambling which may not be suitable for children under the age of 18.
	No Rating	These apps cannot be downloaded/purchased on the App Store, as apps on the App Store need to have a rating for children's safety.

=== Former ===
Symbol	Rating	Description
	12+	May contain frequent or intense cartoon, fantasy or realistic violence, mild or infrequent mature or suggestive themes, mild or infrequent profanity, and simulated gambling which may not be suitable for children under the age of 12. Infrequent or mild sexual content is sometimes listed, which is since regarded as a danger to non-pubescent aged children. Replaced with 13+ starting with iOS 26.
	17+	May contain frequent and intense profanity, excessive cartoon, fantasy, or realistic violence, frequent and intense mature, horror, suggestive themes, sexual content, nudity, alcohol, and drugs, or a combination of any of these factors which are unsuitable for persons under 17 years of age. This includes apps with unrestricted web access. No Apple ID owned by anyone aged 16 and under could purchase an app rated 17+. Replaced with 16+ and 18+ starting with iOS 26.

== App approval process ==
Applications are subject to approval by Apple, as outlined in the SDK agreement, for basic reliability testing and other analysis. Applications may still be distributed "ad hoc" if they are rejected, by the author manually submitting a request to Apple to license the application to individual iPhones, although Apple may withdraw the ability for authors to do this at a later date.

As of 2013, Apple employed mostly static analysis for their app review process, which means that dynamic code reassembly techniques could defeat the review process.

In June 2017, Apple updated its App Store review guidelines to specify that app developers will no longer have the ability to use custom prompts for encouraging users to leave reviews for their apps. With the release of iOS 11 in late 2017, Apple also let developers choose whether to keep current app reviews when updating their apps or to reset. Additionally, another update to App Store policies allows users to optionally "tip" content creators, by voluntarily sending them money.

== Privacy ==
A privacy experiment conducted in 2019 by the Washington Post determined that third-party apps transmitted a host of personal data without the user's knowledge or consent, including phone number, email, exact location, device model and IP address, to "a dozen marketing companies, research firms and other personal data guzzlers" via 5,400 hidden app trackers. Some of the information shared with third parties was found to be in violation of the apps' own privacy regulations. Apple responded to the controversy by introducing "privacy nutrition labels" on the App Store, forcing all apps to disclose their data use.

== Controversial apps and removals ==
In November 2012, Boyfriend Maker, which is a dating sim game, was removed due to "reports of references to violent sexual acts and paedophilia" deemed inappropriate to Boyfriend Maker's age rating of 4+. A revised version called Boyfriend Plus was approved by Apple in April 2013.

In March 2013, HiddenApps was approved and appeared in App Store. The app provided access to developer diagnostic menus, allowed for stock apps to be hidden, and enabled an opt-out feature for iAds, Apple's developer-driven advertisement system. The app was removed shortly afterwards for violating guidelines.

In April 2013, Apple removed AppGratis, a then-successful app store market that promoted paid apps by offering one for free each day. Apple told All Things Digital that the app violated two of its developer agreement clauses, including "Apps that display Apps other than your own for purchase or promotion in a manner similar to or confusing with the App Store will be rejected" and "Apps cannot use Push Notifications to send advertising, promotions, or direct marketing of any kind". Apple did, however, tell the developers they were "welcome to resubmit" after changing the app, though there was "not much hope that it could survive in anything like its current incarnation".

In November 2014, Apple removed the marijuana social networking app MassRoots, with the reason given that it "encourage[d] excessive consumption of alcohol or illegal substances." In February 2015, MassRoots was reintroduced into the store after Apple changed its enforcement guidelines to allow cannabis social apps in the 23 states where it is legal.

In September 2015, it was discovered that "hundreds" of apps submitted and approved on App Store were using XcodeGhost, a malicious version of the Xcode development software. The issues prompted Apple to remove infected apps from the store and issue a statement that it was "working with the developers to make sure they're using the proper version of Xcode". A security firm later published lists of infected apps, including a China-only version of Angry Birds 2, CamCard, Lifesmart, TinyDeal.com, and WeChat. In the aftermath, Apple stated that it would make Xcode faster to download in certain regions outside the United States, and contacted all developers to ensure they only download the code from the Mac App Store or Apple's website, and provided a code signature for developers to test if they are running a tampered version of Xcode.

In June 2017, a scamming trend was discovered on the store, in which developers make apps built on non-existent services, attach in-app purchase subscriptions to the opening dialogue, then buy App Store search advertising space to get the app into the higher rankings. In one instance, an app by the name of "Mobile protection :Clean & Security VPN" [sic] would require payments of $99.99 for a seven-day subscription after a short trial. Apple has not yet responded to the issues.

In addition, Apple has removed software licensed under the GNU General Public License (GPL) from App Store, due to text in Apple's Terms of Service agreement imposing digital rights management and proprietary legal terms incompatible with the terms of the GPL.

As of December 2025, the App Store hosts Absher (application), a stalkerware app by the Saudi government.

=== Large-scale app removals ===
On September 1, 2016, Apple announced that starting September 7, it would be removing old apps that do not function as intended or that do not follow current review guidelines. Developers will be warned and given 30 days to update their apps, but apps that crash on startup will be removed immediately. Additionally, the app names registered by developers cannot exceed 50 characters, in an attempt to stop developers from inserting long descriptions or irrelevant terms in app names to improve the app's ranking in App Store search results. App intelligence firm Sensor Tower revealed in November 2016 that Apple, as promised from its September announcement of removing old apps, had removed 47,300 apps from App Store in October 2016, a 238 percent increase of its prior number of average monthly app removals.

In June 2017, TechCrunch reported that Apple had turned its app removal focus on apps copying functionality from other, popular apps. An example cited included "if a popular game like Flappy Bird or Red Ball hits the charts, there will be hundreds or thousands of clones within weeks that attempt to capitalize on the initial wave of popularity". The report also noted removals of music apps serving pirated tracks. The publication wrote that, since the initial September app removals began, Apple had removed "multiple hundreds of thousands" of apps.

In December 2017, a new report from TechCrunch stated that Apple had begun enforcing new restrictions on the use of "commercialized template or app generation services". Originally introduced as part of Apple's 2017 developer conference, new App Store guidelines allow the company to ban apps making use of templates or commercial app services. This affected many small businesses, with TechCrunch's report citing that "local retailers, restaurants, small fitness studios, nonprofits, churches and other organizations" benefit from using templates or app services due to minimal costs. Developers had received notice from Apple with a January 1, 2018 deadline to change their respective apps. The news caught the attention of Congress, with Congressman Ted Lieu writing a letter to Apple at the beginning of December, asking it to reconsider, writing that "It is my understanding that many small businesses, research organizations, and religious institutions rely on template apps when they do not possess the resources to develop apps in-house", and that the new rules cast "too wide a net", specifically "invalidating apps from longstanding and legitimate developers who pose no threat to the App Store's integrity". Additionally, the news of stricter enforcement caused significant criticism from app development firms; one company told TechCrunch that it chose to close down its business following the news, saying that "The 4.2.6 [rule enforcement] was just a final drop that made us move on a bit faster with that decision [to close]", and another company told the publication that "There was no way in June [when the guidelines changed] that we would have said, 'that's going to target our apps' ... Apple had told us you aren't being targeted by this from a quality standpoint. So being hit now under the umbrella of spam is shocking to every quality developer out there and all the good actors". Furthermore, the latter company stated that "there's only so much you can do with apps that perform the same utility – ordering food". A third company said that "Rule 4.2.6 is a concrete illustration of the danger of Apple's dominant position", and a fourth said that "They've wiped out pretty much an entire industry. Not just DIY tools like AppMakr, but also development suites like Titanium". Towards the end of the year, Apple updated the guideline to clarify that companies and organizations are allowed to use template apps, but only as long as they directly publish their app on their own; it remained a violation of the rule for commercial app services to publish apps for the respective clients.

Apple prevented over $2.2 billion in potentially fraudulent transactions on its App Store in 2025 and rejected over 2 million app submissions for violating App Store review guidelines.

=== Censorship by governments ===
==== China ====
In January 2017, Apple complied with a request from the Chinese government to remove the Chinese version of The New York Times' app. This followed the government's efforts in 2012 to block the Times' website after stories of hidden wealth among family members of then-leader of China, Wen Jiabao, were published. In a statement, an Apple spokesperson told the media that "we have been informed that the app is in violation of local regulations", though would not specify which regulations, and added that "As a result the app must be taken down off the China app store. When this situation changes the app store will once again offer the New York Times app for download in China". The following July, it was reported that Apple had begun to remove listings in China for apps that circumvent government Internet censorship policies and new laws restricting virtual private network (VPN) services. Apple issued a statement, explaining that the app removals were a result of developers not complying with new laws in China requiring a government license for businesses offering VPNs, and that "These apps remain available in all other markets where they do business". In an earnings call the following month, Cook elaborated on the recent news, explainining that "We would obviously rather not remove the apps, but like we do in other countries, we follow the law wherever we do business". Besides VPN services, a number of Internet calling apps, including Microsoft's Skype, were also removed from the Chinese App Store in 2017, with Apple telling The New York Times that, similar to the VPN apps, these new apps also violated local law. Microsoft explained to BBC News that its Skype app had been "temporarily removed" and that it was "working to reinstate the app as soon as possible", though many news outlets reported on the Chinese government's increased efforts and pressure to crack down on Internet freedom.

Following Apple CEO Tim Cook's appearance at China's World Internet Conference in December 2017, free speech and human rights activists criticized Cook and the company. Maya Wang at Human Rights Watch told The Washington Post that "Cook's appearance lends credibility to a state that aggressively censors the internet, throws people in jail for being critical about social ills, and is building artificial intelligence systems that monitors everyone and targets dissent. ... The version of cyberspace the Chinese government is building is a decidedly dystopian one, and I don't think anyone would want to share in this 'common future.' Apple should have spoken out against it, not endorsed it." U.S. Senator Patrick Leahy told CNBC that "American tech companies have become leading champions of free expression. But that commitment should not end at our borders. ... Global leaders in innovation, like Apple, have both an opportunity and a moral obligation to promote free expression and other basic human rights in countries that routinely deny these rights."

Cook told Reuters that "My hope over time is that some of the things, the couple of things that's been pulled, come back. I have great hope on that and great optimism on that". However, TechCrunch's Jon Russell criticized this line of thinking, writing that "Firstly, Apple didn't just remove a 'couple of things' from the reach of China-based users", but rather "a couple of hundred" apps, acknowledging that "even that is under counting". Furthermore, Russell listed censorship efforts by the Chinese government, including VPN bans and restrictions on live video and messaging apps, and wrote that "Apple had little choice but to follow Beijing's line in order to continue to do business in the lucrative Chinese market, but statements like Cook's today are dangerous because they massively underplay the severity of the situation". Florida Senator Marco Rubio also criticized Cook's appearance at the World Internet Conference, describing the situation as "here's an example of a company, in my view, so desperate to have access to the Chinese market place that they are willing to follow the laws of that country even if those laws run counter to what those companies' own standards are supposed to be". In August 2018, as a result of Chinese regulations, 25,000 illegal apps were pulled down by Apple from the App Store in China.

In October 2019, Apple rejected, approved, and finally removed an app used by participants in the 2019–20 Hong Kong protests.

Apple began removing thousands of video game apps from their platform in China during December 2020 in accordance to regulations regarding licensing enacted by the country's Cyberspace Administration, in many cases without explicitly stating the offences grounding their removal. Apple released a memo that month telling developers of premium games and apps with in-app purchases had until December 31 to submit proof of a government license. Research from the Campaign for Accountability notes there are more than 3,000 apps not appearing in China which are available in other countries, a third of which the advocacy group claims to have been removed due to advocating for various human rights issues, including LGBTQ+ rights and the Hong Kong protests. A director of the aforementioned campaign, Katie Paul, criticised Apple's removals stating "if it's going to bend to political pressure, the company should explain why and what they would lose if they didn't do that." CEO Tim Cook has previously defended such company actions, stating in a memo to employees in 2019 that "national and international debates will outlive us all, and while important, they do not govern the facts."

In August 2023, at the request of the Chinese government, Apple took down more than 100 AI-related apps similar to ChatGPT in the Chinese app store.

According to the regulations of Chinese government, new apps on the China app store from September 2023 must be licensed by the Chinese government. Older apps must obtain a license before March 2024.

In April 2026, Apple took down BitChat at the request of the Chinese government.

==== Russia ====
Apple removed the Smart Voting app from the App Store before the 2021 Russian legislative election. The application, which had been created by associates of imprisoned opposition leader Alexei Navalny, offered voting advice for all voting districts in Russia. It was removed after a meeting with Russian Federation Council officials on September 16, 2021. Apple also reportedly disabled its iCloud Private Relay privacy feature which masks users' browsing activity. Russian opposition figures condemned these moves as political censorship.

In 2024, Russian regulator Roskomnadzor asked Apple to take down 25 VPN apps from the Russian App Store, but Apple quietly took down more.

==== United States ====
In October 2025, following a request by the Trump administration, Apple removed ICE tracking apps, which could notify users about the presence of Immigration and Customs Enforcement agents in their area.

=== Removal of vaping apps ===
In November 2019, Apple removed all applications related to vaping from the App Store, citing warning from health experts. Apple made this decision to reduce the promotion of e-cigarette use.

== Antitrust allegations ==
Apple has faced criticism, lawsuits and government investigations alleging that its control over the distribution of iOS and iPadOS apps through the App Store constituted monopolistic practices.

=== Epic Games ===
Since as early as 2017, Tim Sweeney had questioned the need for digital storefronts like Valve's Steam, Apple's iOS App Store, and Google Play, to take a 30% revenue sharing cut, and argued that when accounting for current rates of content distribution and other factors needed, a revenue cut of 8% should be sufficient to run any digital storefront profitably.

On August 13, 2020, Epic Games updated Fortnite across all platforms, including the iOS version, to reduce the price of "V-Bucks" (the in-game currency) by 20% if they purchased directly from Epic. For iOS users, if they purchased through the Apple storefront, they were not given this discount, as Epic said they could not extend the discount due to the 30% revenue cut taken by Apple. Within hours, Apple had removed Fortnite from their storefronts, stating the means of bypassing their payment systems violated the terms of service. Epic immediately filed separate lawsuits against Apple and Google for antitrust and anticompetitive behavior in the United States District Court for the Northern District of California. Epic did not seek monetary damages in either case but instead was "seeking injunctive relief to allow fair competition in these two key markets that directly affect hundreds of millions of consumers and tens of thousands, if not more, of third-party app developers." In comments on social media the next day, Sweeney said that they undertook the actions as "we're fighting for the freedom of people who bought smartphones to install apps from sources of their choosing, the freedom for creators of apps to distribute them as they choose, and the freedom of both groups to do business directly. The primary opposing argument is: 'Smartphone makers can do whatever they want.' This as an awful notion. We all have rights, and we need to fight to defend our rights against whoever would deny them."

Apple responded to the lawsuit that it would terminate Epic's developer accounts by August 28, 2020, leading Epic to file a motion for a preliminary injunction to force Apple to return Fortnite to the App Store and prevent them from terminating Epic's developer accounts, as the latter action would leave Epic unable to update the Unreal Engine for any changes to iOS or macOS and leave developers that relied on Unreal at risk. The court granted the preliminary injunction against Apple from terminating the developer accounts as Epic had shown "potential significant damage to both the Unreal Engine platform itself, and to the gaming industry generally", but refused to grant the injunction related to Fortnite as "The current predicament appears of [Epic's] own making."

In a September 2021 ruling in the first part of the case, Judge Yvonne Gonzalez Rogers decided in favor of Apple on nine of ten counts, but found against Apple on its anti-steering policies under the California Unfair Competition Law. Rogers prohibited Apple from stopping developers from informing users of other payment systems within apps. While Apple implemented App Store policies to allow developers to link to alternative payment options, the policies still required the developer to provide a 27% revenue share back to Apple, and heavily restricted how they could be shown in apps. Epic filed complaints that these changes violated the ruling, and in April 2025 Rogers found for Epic that Apple had willfully violated her injunction, placing further restrictions on Apple including banning them from collecting revenue shares from non-Apple payment methods or imposing any restrictions on links to such alternative payment options.

== See also ==
- List of Mac software
- List of free and open-source iOS applications
- List of iOS games
- List of mobile app distribution platforms
