= Unity Technologies =

Danish-American software company

Unity Software Inc.
- Trade name: Unity Technologies; Unity
- Formerly: Over the Edge I/S (2004–2007)
- Type: Public
- Traded as: NYSE: U; Russell 1000 component
- Industry: Software; Video games
- Founded: August 2, 2004; 22 years ago in Copenhagen, Denmark
- Founders: David Helgason; Nicholas Francis; Joachim Ante
- Headquarters: San Francisco, US
- Key people: Matthew Bromberg (CEO); Jim Whitehurst (chairman)
- Products: Unity
- Services: Unity Certification; Unity Collaborate; Unity Asset Store; Unity Ads; Unity Cloud Build; Unity Analytics; Unity Everyplay (2012–2018); Unity Multiplayer; Unity Performance Reporting
- Revenue: ▲US$1.85 billion (2025)
- Operating income: ▼US$−479 million (2025)
- Net income: ▼US$−401.5 million (2025)
- Total assets: ▲US$6.84 billion (2025)
- Total equity: ▼US$−3.24 billion (2025)
- Number of employees: 4,987 (2024)
- Subsidiaries: ChilliConnect; deltaDNA; Vivox; Artomatix; Ziva Dynamics; ironSource; Interactive Data Visualization, Inc. (IDV)
- Website: unity.com

Unity Software Inc. (doing business as Unity Technologies or simply Unity) is an American video game software development company based in San Francisco. It was founded in Denmark in August 2004 as Over the Edge I/S (Note: Doing business as Over the Edge Entertainment.) and changed its name in 2007. Unity Technologies is best known for the development of Unity, a licensed game engine used to create video games and other applications.

== History ==
=== Founding and early success (2004–2008) ===
Unity Technologies was founded as Over the Edge I/S (doing business as Over the Edge Entertainment) in Copenhagen on August 2, 2004, by David Helgason (chief executive officer), Nicholas Francis (chief creative officer), and Joachim Ante (chief technology officer). Over the Edge released its first game, GooBall, in 2005. The game failed commercially, but the three founders saw value in the game development tools that they had created to simplify game development, so they shifted the company's focus to creating an engine for other developers.

The company sought to "democratize" game development and make the development of 2D and 3D interactive content more accessible. Unity was named the runner-up for Best Use of Mac OS X Graphics at the 2006 Apple Design Awards. The company grew with the 2007 release of the iPhone, as Unity Technologies produced one of the first engines supporting the platform in full. Because the games industry was focused on console games when the iPhone and App Store were released, Unity was positioned to support developers looking to create mobile games. Its dominance on the iPhone was largely uncontested for a couple of years. In 2007, Over the Edge changed its name to Unity Technologies.

=== New platforms and expansion (2009–2019) ===
The technology was developed for different platforms. By 2018, Unity was used to make games and other experiences for more than 25 platforms, including mobile, desktop, consoles, and virtual reality. Unity games can also be deployed on the Web.

The Unity Asset Store launched in November 2010 as an online marketplace for Unity users to sell project assets (artwork, code systems, audio, etc.) to each other.

In April 2012, Unity reportedly had 1 million registered developers, 300,000 of whom used Unity on a monthly basis. In May of the same year, a survey by Game Developer revealed that approximately 53% of mobile game developers were using Unity. By 2016, the company reported more than 5.5 million registered users. Part of Unity's appeal is that it allows people who lack the technical knowledge to program games from scratch to create games and other simulations.

Facebook integrated a software development kit for games using the Unity game engine in 2013. The kit featured tools that allowed tracking advertising campaigns and deep linking, where users were directly linked from social media posts to specific portions within games, and in-game-image sharing.

Unity acquired Applifier, a Helsinki-based mobile service provider, in March 2014. Applifier's game replay sharing and community service was initially called Everyplay, and became known as Unity Everyplay. The acquisition also meant that Applifier's mobile video ad network, GameAds, became Unity Ads. Two more acquisitions followed later in 2014: Playnomics, a data analysis platform for developers (now Unity Analytics), and Tsugi, whose continuous integration service became known as Unity Cloud Build.

In October 2014, Helgason announced in a blog post that he would be stepping down as CEO with John Riccitiello, the former CEO of game company Electronic Arts, replacing him. Helgason remained with the company as executive vice-president. Unity Technologies made a brief foray into virtual reality with their support for Chinese company AntVR in late 2014. Unity co-developed Legend of the Curse for the Jitao headset, but the hardware never achieved mainstream popularity.

Software developer Niantic released Pokémon Go, which was built using Unity engine, in 2016. Following the success of Pokémon Go, Unity Technologies held several rounds of funding that increased the company's valuation: In July 2016, a $181 million round of funding valued the company at approximately $1.5 billion; in May 2017, the company raised $400 million that valued the company at $2.8 billion; and in 2018 Unity's CEO confirmed a $145 million round that valued the company at approximately $3 billion. Also in 2016, Facebook developed PC gaming platform Facebook Gameroom with Unity. In 2017, Unity Technologies acquired Multiplay, a business that offers multiplayer server game hosting, from retailer Game for £19 million.

Unity Technologies released the Unity 2017 version of its platform in 2017. Unity worked with Google on ARCore in 2017 to develop augmented reality tools for Android devices and apps. The following year, Unity Technologies worked with Google Cloud to offer services for online game developers and Alphabet Inc. subsidiary DeepMind to develop virtual world artificial intelligence. The Unity platform is used to help machines through reinforced learning. According to Fast Company, DeepMind uses Unity software to train algorithms in "physics-realistic environments", where a computer will continually try to achieve a goal through trial and error.

The use of Unity Technologies software expanded beyond games in the 2010s, including film and television and automotive. For the automotive industry, carmakers use Unity's virtual reality platform for design and virtual world car testing simulations. In October 2018, Unity Technologies acquired Digital Monarch Media, a Canadian virtual cinematography company.

Unity Technologies created the Unity Icon Collective in November 2018. The team creates assets for sale in the Unity Asset Store for PC and consoles. The assets—characters, environments, art, and animation—can be used in high-quality games; the move was seen as an attempt to compete with Unity's rivals, such as Epic Games' Unreal Engine.

The company acquired Vivox, a cross-platform voice and text chat provider based in Framingham, Massachusetts, in January 2019. At an acquisition price of $123.4 million, the company became a wholly owned subsidiary of Unity Technologies and operates independently. Vivox's technology is used in Fortnite, PlayerUnknown's Battlegrounds, and League of Legends, among others. Terms of the deal were not disclosed. In May 2019, the company confirmed a $150 million Series E funding round that increased its valuation to $6 billion. In July that year, it announced that together with D1 Capital Partners, CPP Investment Board, Light Street Capital, Sequoia Capital and Silver Lake Partners, it would fund a $525 million tender to allow Unity's common shareholders to sell their shares in the company. Unity Technologies additionally purchased game analytics company deltaDNA in September 2019, which was later reported at a value of $53.1 million. The company continued their acquisitions by buying live game management platform ChilliConnect in October 2019, and 3D application streaming service Furioos creator Obvioos in November 2019. That same year, Unity paid $48.8 million to acquire Artomatix, a company that develops an AI-assisted material creation tool called ArtEngine. Despite growing revenues of $541.8 million, Unity also posted growing losses of $163.2 million.

The company's IPO filing revealed that they reported losses of over $162.3 million in 2019, and have consistently lost money since its founding in 2004. Despite the losses, the company has consistently grown in terms of revenue and employee numbers.

=== Going public and further acquisitions (2020–2022) ===
In June 2020, Unity announced that they had partnered with Apple to update the Unity Engine to run on Apple silicon-equipped Macs with the 2020.2 release, allowing game developers to update their games to support the new hardware platform. An Apple silicon-ported version of the Unity Editor was demoed during the WWDC 2020 Platforms State of the Union event. On August 17 of that year, Unity stated that it had acquired Codice Software, who make the distributed version control system Plastic SCM. That same year, Unity acquired Finger Food Advanced Technology Group for $46.8 million.

Unity announced its plans to offer an initial public offering (IPO) in August 2020. At the time, the company reported 1.5 million monthly users, with 150,000 new projects started daily. The company completed its IPO on September 17, 2020, at a total of US$1.3 billion, above its target price, and started trading as a public company on the New York Stock Exchange under the single-letter ticker U on the following day. The IPO gave Unity an estimated value of US$13.7 billion.

In December 2020, Unity announced the acquisition of the multiplayer networking framework, MLAPI, and RestAR, a computer vision and deep learning company. In June 2021, it acquired Pixyz Software, a developer of 3D data optimization technology. The company announced plans to acquire Parsec, desktop streaming software, in August 2021 for $320 million. It also acquired the mobile game creation platform struckd at that month.

In a cash and shares deal Unity acquired Weta Digital for $1.63 billion in November 2021. Unity added the "Wellington-based company's 275 engineers to its workforce". The latter's visual special effects and animation teams "will continue to exist as a standalone entity", becoming Unity's "largest customer in the media and entertainment space". WetaFX remains majority owned by Peter Jackson. November 2021 represented the high point in Unity's share price, which was likely overvalued at the time, and was followed by years of decline.

In January 2022, Unity announced the acquisition of Ziva Dynamics, a Vancouver-based VFX company. In March 2022, they announced a partnership with Insomniac to create interactive online concerts and events. In June 2022, Unity laid off 4% of its workforce, estimated to be over 200 workers. In July 2022, Unity agreed to buy ironSource in an all-stock deal worth US$4.4 billion. On completion of the deal, Unity shareholders will own about 73.5% of the combined company and current ironSource shareholders will keep about 26.5%. Unity will also receive a $1 billion investment from Sequoia Capital and Silver Lake once the deal is closed.

In August 2022, AppLovin made an unsolicited offer to buy Unity in exchange for $17.54 billion in an all-stock deal. The proposed merger would result in the former Unity CEO John Riccitiello becoming the CEO of the combined entity. AppLovin's bid excludes ironSource, that Unity agreed to buy in July. Later that month, Unity's board rejected the offer and committed to complete its acquisition of ironSource. The ironSource merger was completed in November 2022.

=== Controversy, layoffs, new leadership (2023–2024) ===
In January 2023, 284 employees were laid off. In May, Unity announced it would layoff 600 jobs, about 8% of its global workforce.

==== Pricing controversy ====
In September 2023, Unity announced changes to its pricing model, introducing new Unity Runtime Fees, which charges developers based on installs past a certain threshold, depending on their Unity plan. These changes were met with negative reactions from the developer community, with many expressing dissatisfaction and concerns regarding the increased financial burden as a result of the new pricing structure, including possible damages from inaccurate installation count estimates or malicious actors, as well as fee thresholds applying retroactively. Offices across the United States were temporarily shut down and authorities were contacted due to targeted death threats.

Unity released revised terms in response to the negative feedback on September 22, 2023. These changes include having no fees for Unity Personal, which can be used for projects funded up to $200,000 instead of $100,000, fees would only apply to games developed with Unity 2024 and onward without any retroactive fees, and that the fee would be based on self-reporting, the lesser of 2.5% of monthly revenue or a calculated amount based on monthly engagements. Despite the partial walkback, according to Wired, the company's reputation could be irreparably damaged, with some developers having stated they would not return to using the company's services or products over lack of trust going forward.

On October 9, 2023, Unity announced that Riccitiello would be leaving the company amid controversy, appointing James M. Whitehurst as interim CEO and president. Another round of layoffs was announced in January 2024. Unity cut 1,800 jobs, or 25% of its workforce, as part of a "company reset". In May 2024, the company announced that Matthew Bromberg had been appointed to the role of permanent CEO, with Jim Whitehurst taking the position of Executive Chair of the board and Roelof Botha resuming his duties as Lead Independent Director of the board.

In the year to May 2024, the stock price for Unity declined over 60%, with the decline attributed to business decisions over the period including the runtime fee policy. From its peak valuation of 57 billion dollars in November 2021, it had declined to 6 billion dollars by September 2024, with further revenue declines expected by market analysts. In September 2024, Unity canceled the Runtime Fee and reverted to its seat-based subscription model, with subscription price increases of 8% for Unity Pro and 25% for Unity Enterprise taking effect on January 1, 2025. CEO Matt Bromberg said it was the company's "intention to revert to a more traditional cycle of considering any potential price increases only on an annual basis."

==== Divestitures ====
In November 2023, Unity announced that they would dismiss 265 employees as part of a termination of its agreement with Weta Digital, an acquisition that they previously spent US$1.63 billion on in 2021. Unity also announced in March 2026 that they would shut down ironSource which they previously acquired in 2022 for US$4.4 billion.

=== 2025–2026 developments ===
In February 2025, Unity Technologies announced Vector, an AI-powered advertising platform built to replace its existing ad network and compete with market leader AppLovin. It became generally available in May 2025, when Unity migrated its Android and iOS ad traffic to it. The introduction of Vector led to what CEO Matt Bromberg described as a turning point in the company's recovery following its 2024 restructuring.

In April 2025, Unity Technologies unveiled Survival Kids, a survival game it developed in-house in collaboration with Konami, as a Nintendo Switch 2 launch title. It was released on June 5, 2025. Reported as Unity's first internally developed game in about two decades, the project was built to test the Unity engine under real production conditions and to ready it for the Switch 2's launch.

In November 2025, at its Unite conference in Barcelona, Unity Technologies announced a partnership with Epic Games, unveiled in a surprise on-stage appearance by Epic CEO Tim Sweeney alongside Bromberg. Under the partnership, developers would be able to publish Unity-built games into Fortnite, with further details expected in 2026.

In April 2026, Unity and Meta extended a multi-year platform support and enterprise agreement for virtual reality, after Meta dropped VR support from its own Horizon Engine.

In May 2026, Unity Technologies released Unity AI, a suite of generative-AI tools built into the Unity Editor, in open beta.

In July 2026, Unity announced dedicated engine support for Netflix Games, including optimization for Netflix's cloud gaming service and cross-platform builds for mobile and television.

On October 7, 2026, Google and Unity announced a partnership to develop a combined platform for creating video games from prompts using generative AI tools. The partnership includes Playground, an experimental platform developed by Google, and Unity Spark, a prompt-based creation tool connected to the Unity Asset Store.

Reuters reported in November 2026 that the Saudi Arabia Public Investment Fund (PIF) and Silver Lake have been in talks with Unity Software to acquire the company at a valuation of $25 billion. PIF and Silver Lake were previously involved in the buyout of Electronic Arts earlier in 2026. In a later interview with Game Developer Unity senior vice president Adam Smith did not elaborate on the purpose of the talks only confirming that Unity had recent positive financial results.

== Corporate affairs ==
Unity Technologies is a public company based in San Francisco, California; its IPO was in September 2020. As of 2018, the company employed more than 2,000 people in offices across North America, Europe and Asia. Until October 2023, it was headed by John Riccitiello, who replaced co-founder David Helgason as chief executive officer (CEO) in 2014. Danny Lange previously served as vice-president of artificial intelligence and machine learning from late 2016 to 2023, when he left to join Google. Unity Technologies named its first independent directors in 2017. Riccitiello said the move was needed if the company intended to go public in the future. According to TechCrunch, Unity Technologies had raised more than $600 million in funding and was valued at about $3 billion by 2018. Its investors include Sequoia Capital, Draper Fisher Jurvetson, Silver Lake, China Investment Corporation, FreeS Fund, Thrive Capital, WestSummit Capital and Max Levchin. Revenue streams include licensing fees for its game engine, its Unity Asset Store, and the Unity platform.

Unity's business is split into Operate Solutions (consisting of Unity Ads, Unity In-App Purchases, and other tools, which was newly established in 2015), Create Solutions (consisting of Unity Engine subscriptions and other professional services) and Strategic Partnerships. In 2019, of its reported revenue Operate Solutions accounted for 54%, Create Solutions for 31% and the remaining income sources for 15%.

In 2017, Unity Technologies launched Unity Without Borders, a program that sponsored 50 video game programmers from the Middle East to attend Unity's Unite Europe conference in Amsterdam. Unity Without Borders sponsored video game programmers affected by travel restrictions by President Donald Trump's administration. Unity also awards annual grants through its Unity for Humanity awards, given to creators building games and experiences using Unity's real-time 3D technology.

Unity announced it had reached net-zero carbon emissions in 2020, and simultaneously signed onto the Science Based Targets Initiative.

In January 2021, Unity hired former Liverpool F.C. CEO Peter Moore as SVP and GM of Sports and Live Entertainment.

== Unity engine ==
Unity's eponymous platform is used to create two-dimensional, three-dimensional, virtual reality, and augmented reality video games and other simulations. The engine originally launched in 2005 to create video games, and was later marketed to other industries, including film and car manufacturing. In September 2022, Unity added server-hosting and game matchmaking services to Unity Software’s suite of tools, and in March 2023, the company announced a marketplace for AI-generated assets, including characters, environments, animations, and sound effects.

As of 2020, Unity-made applications were used by 2 billion monthly active users, with 1.5 million monthly creators. It supports more than 25 platforms, and has been used to create approximately half of mobile games on the market and 60 percent of augmented reality and virtual reality content, including approximately 90 percent on emerging augmented reality platforms, such as Microsoft HoloLens, and 90 percent of Samsung Gear VR content. According to Fortune, Unity "dominates the virtual reality business".

== Unity Studio ==
In 2025, Unity launched the beta for Unity Studio (formerly Unity Lite), a browser-based, no-code 3D editor; the platform reached general availability (GA) in 2026, though the beta program remains open for ongoing feature testing. Designed for accessibility, the tool allows users to create interactive experiences without local installation or programming knowledge. Unity Studio only requires the use of a browser that supports WebGPU. It utilizes a visual scripting system called Logic to add behaviors and interactivity to 3D scenes. It is primarily useful for designers, artists, and non-technical roles, such as project managers, engineers, and marketing teams, for rapid prototyping, interactive training modules, and Human-Machine Interface (HMI) design.

While Unity Studio facilitates internal design reviews and web-based exports for external stakeholders, it is not intended for complex application development. Professional developers requiring advanced features, such as C# scripting or deep performance optimization tools, should use the standard Unity Editor.

== See also ==
- List of game engines
