= Andrew Karam =

American businessman

- Born: Andrew Karam; 1981 or 1982 (age 43–44)
- Education: Tufts University (BA, BS)
- Known for: Cofounder of AppLovin

Andrew Karam (born 1981/1982) is an American businessman and billionaire who cofounded mobile game developer AppLovin.

== Biography ==
Karam is a graduate of Tufts University where he received a B.A. in economics and a B.S. in engineering. After school, he cofounded Social Hour and Style Page, a social platform for designers. In 2012, he cofounded the mobile game developer AppLovin with Adam Foroughi and John Krystynak. AppLovin went public in April 2021. As of 2022, Karam owns 8% of AppLovin stock.

== Personal life ==
He lives in Menlo Park, California.

== Net worth ==
Forbes lists his net worth as of April 2022 at US$1.1 billion.
