= Ballz (mobile game) =

- Publisher(s): Ketchapp
- Platform(s): iOS and Android
- Genre(s): Endless round
- Mode(s): Single-player

Ballz is an endless round mobile game published by Ketchapp. It is available on iOS and Android.

== Gameplay ==
In the start of the game, a player is introduced with a single ball at the bottom of the screen and square blocks with associated numbers near the top of the screen. Then the player can use their finger to pull back and release the ball(s) at a desired angle to hit the squares progressively lowering the number until they are gone. Additionally, there are small white circles spread throughout the screen that can be hit increasing the amount of balls available to the user. If the user fails to destroy the squares before they reach the bottom the game is ended.

== Reception ==
In March 2017, Ballz was the number 1 game in the Apple App Store.
