= Wordscapes =

2017 mobile word puzzle game

- App icon
- Developer: PeopleFun
- Publisher: PeopleFun
- Platforms: iOS, Android
- Release: June 2017
- Genres: Puzzle, word game
- Mode: Single-player

Wordscapes is a word puzzle mobile game developed by PeopleFun, a studio based in Richardson, Texas, and released for iOS and Android in June 2017. Players swipe across a wheel of letters to form words that fill a crossword-style grid. The game is free to download and earns money from optional purchases and advertising.

Wordscapes became PeopleFun's most successful game. By 2021 the company reported more than 120 million downloads, 4.5 million daily active users and 14.8 million monthly active users, and in 2022 it said the game had been played by more than 230 million people. It has been described as the top-grossing title in the word game category. PeopleFun was acquired by AppLovin in 2018 and became part of Tripledot Studios in 2025.

== Gameplay ==
Each level shows a set of letters arranged in a wheel at the bottom of the screen and an empty crossword grid above it. The player links letters by swiping between them, and each correct word is written into the grid. The level is complete once every space has been filled. PeopleFun describes the game as a blend of the crossword and the word search, while reviewers have compared it to a mix of Boggle and a crossword puzzle.

Valid words that are not part of the grid count as bonus words and earn one coin each, but only the first time a level is played. Proper nouns are never accepted, and PeopleFun notes that not every real English word is accepted as a bonus word, describing the discovery of which words count as part of the game. A player who is stuck can shuffle the wheel or spend coins on hints. The lightbulb reveals one random letter, the rocket scatters several random letters across the grid, the bullseye reveals a letter in a square chosen by the player, and bees place letters and coins on the board.

The main game has 6,000 regular levels. After level 6,000, players continue into the Master Levels, which have no end. According to PeopleFun, the puzzles grow larger and harder as the game goes on, and the largest use seven letters.

Finding words earns Brilliance, a score that builds up over time and cannot be spent like coins. A level gives more Brilliance when it has more words and longer words. Brilliance scores are ranked on a global leaderboard and a local one, and players connected to Facebook also see a ranking of their friends. The leaderboard resets every month. The game is available in English, Spanish, German, French and Portuguese.

=== Daily Puzzle ===
Alongside the numbered levels, the game offers a Daily Puzzle, a new board every 24 hours that does not appear among the regular levels. Some of its squares hold butterflies, which the player collects by placing a word across them, and each butterfly caught releases another one onto the board. Butterflies fill a progress bar that unlocks four pictures over the course of a month. The challenge resets on the first day of each month, and pictures unlocked during the previous month are lost. The monthly collection can also be filled with cocoons that appear in regular levels for limited periods.

=== Events ===
Wordscapes runs recurring timed events. In the weekly Portrait Events, held on Wednesdays and Thursdays, binoculars appear in the grid. Filling ten binocular squares awards a random piece of a collectible portrait, and three pieces complete a portrait that can be used as a profile picture. Butterfly Events, held on Tuesdays, place cocoons in the grid. The cocoons hatch into butterflies that join a habitat on the player's profile, and the habitat changes with the seasons.

Mt. Fortune, unlocked at level 62, is a daily prize game in which the player climbs a mountain by opening gift boxes. At each numbered step one box hides stones that send the player back down with no prizes, unless coins are spent to keep climbing. The mountain can be climbed once a day, and further climbs cost coins or require watching an advertisement. Prizes include portrait pieces, bees, hints and heart gems. Daily Goals, available from level 22, are short challenges that refresh at midnight UTC. Completing them earns small rewards and prize keys, which unlock prizes along month-long seasonal Quests.

=== Wildlife ===
Wordscapes Wildlife, unlocked at level 36, lets players hatch eggs into animals and build a collection. Animals complete timed activities, which can be finished at once by paying coins, and give rewards such as heart gems and bonuses including binoculars, stars, cocoons, Brilliance and bees. The feature needs an internet connection.

=== Teams and tournaments ===
Players can create or join teams, whose members can ask each other for hints and compete together against other teams. Tournaments open at level 65. A weekday tournament for individual players runs from Tuesday morning to Thursday afternoon, Central Time. On weekends a solo tournament and a team tournament run at the same time, from Friday evening to Sunday night. Words and bonus words found during a tournament add to the player's score, and players at the top of the leaderboard win coins and crown rewards. A team needs at least ten members to enter the team tournament, and team prizes are shared among 50 teammates. In 2020, weekend tournaments split players into groups of about 100.

=== Purchases and rewards ===
Players earn coins by finding bonus words and from daily gifts. A Piggy Bank offer gathers additional coins that players can choose to buy, kept separate from their normal balance. PeopleFun later added an optional link to Freecash, a rewards platform run by its partner Almedia. Players who link their account receive a one-time in-game reward and can then earn Freecash rewards for playing Wordscapes. The feature has been rolled out gradually and only in supported countries and on certain platforms.

== Development ==
PeopleFun was founded in 2011 by Tony Goodman, John Boog-Scott and Angelo Laudon. Goodman and Boog-Scott, who met at junior high school in Dallas, had founded Ensemble Studios, the developer of the Age of Empires series, in 1995 and sold it to Microsoft in 2001. Busy with careers and families, they had less time for console and PC games and turned to mobile games, which suited shorter play sessions. The studio released its first game, Word Chums, in September 2012 and went on to focus on word games.

Wordscapes came out in June 2017 and became the studio's breakthrough. PeopleFun followed it with Word Stacks in October 2018, its second most successful game. In 2018 PeopleFun was acquired by AppLovin. D CEO reported in 2020 that since joining AppLovin the studio's revenue had grown nearly sevenfold and its staff from 16 to more than 60 people, and that AppLovin had helped Wordscapes become the top-grossing word game. Carol Miu, who joined PeopleFun in 2018 and led its product and analytics teams, succeeded Goodman as chief executive in April 2022. The company said at the time that its annual revenue had grown from $100 million in 2018 to over $300 million in 2021.

PeopleFun has used the Wordscapes name for other games, including Wordscapes In Bloom, Wordscapes Search and Wordscapes Solitaire.

In May 2025 AppLovin agreed to sell its mobile games business, ten studios including PeopleFun, to the UK-based Tripledot Studios. The sale closed on June 30, 2025, for $400 million in cash and about 20% of Tripledot's equity. In August 2026 Tripledot named Nicholas Le, until then chief executive of its subsidiary Lion Studios, as chief executive of PeopleFun, with a focus on strengthening the Wordscapes franchise.

== Commercial performance ==
By 2021 Wordscapes had topped both the App Store and Google Play charts, and PeopleFun reported 4.5 million daily and 14.8 million monthly active users. In 2022 the company said the game had over 230 million players, and that Wordscapes and Word Stacks ranked first and second in the word games category.

In a 2022 analysis, the games research firm Naavik called Wordscapes the best word game at monetizing its audience. It estimated that the game drew about one million downloads a month and had earned a steady $5 million a month since late 2018, for $216 million in total. The United States accounted for 88% of that revenue, ahead of the United Kingdom (5%), Canada (4%) and Australia (3%). Naavik credited the game's lead to its time-limited events. It noted that Words of Wonders, a game with the same core mechanic, earned around a tenth as much, and that Words with Friends 2 did not reach half of the monthly revenue of Wordscapes until October 2020.

The game remained among the highest-earning word games in its main market. In its report on the fourth quarter of 2025, the analytics firm Sensor Tower listed Wordscapes second among the top five word puzzle games by revenue in the United States, behind NYT Games, with weekly revenue of nearly $517,000 in the last week of December.

== Reception ==
Book Riot placed Wordscapes first in a 2018 list of word game apps, writing that its puzzles start easy and soon get harder, that each round takes only a few minutes, and that its backgrounds are soothing. iPhone Life also ranked it first in its 2023 selection of word puzzle games, as its pick for stress relief. Android Authority included it among the best word games for Android, but criticized its heavy advertising as making the game less friendly to players who do not pay.

=== Community ===
PeopleFun runs a Wordscapes Ambassador Program made up of volunteer players. Ambassadors pass player feedback to the company and share official information across the game's community spaces, which include its Facebook and Instagram accounts and the unofficial r/wordscapes subreddit. The first WordscapesCon was held in 2025 at PeopleFun's headquarters in Dallas. Open only to ambassadors, it brought them together with the development team to give feedback and playtest upcoming features.
