= IronSource =

Israeli digital advertising company

ironSource Ltd.
- Type: Division
- Industry: Mobile games; Mobile advertising
- Founded: 2010; 16 years ago
- Founder: Tomer Bar-Zeev
- Fate: Acquired by Unity
- Headquarters: Tel Aviv, Israel
- Number of locations: 12
- Key people: Tomer Bar-Zeev (CEO & chairman)
- Revenue: ▲US$553 million (2021)
- Operating income: ▲US$82.4 million (2021)
- Net income: ▼US$59.8 million (2021)
- Total assets: ▲US$1.45 billion (2021)
- Total equity: ▲US$1.10 billion (2021)
- Number of employees: 1,121 (December 2021)
- Parent: Unity
- Subsidiaries: AfterDownload; Upopa; SuperSonic
- Website: www.is.com

ironSource Ltd. was an Israeli software company that focused on developing technologies for app monetization and distribution, with its core products focused on the app economy.

Among others, ironSource was chosen as one of the '20 hottest startups' in 2013 and was listed in the Wall Street Journal "Billion Dollar Startup Club". In September 2015, ironSource was named by the World Economic Forum as a Global Growth Company. ironSource was also named one of the hottest pre-IPO tech companies by Business Insider, and one of Israel's most innovative companies by Fast Company. IronSource also received criticism for having a history of distributing malware.

ironSource had over 1,000 employees, with more than half dedicated to research and development. Headquartered in Tel Aviv, ironSource also maintained offices in New York, San Francisco, London, Beijing, Shenzhen, Tokyo, and Seoul.

== History ==
Founded in 2010 in Tel Aviv, ironSource provided platforms and tools for application developers including analytics, user monetization, conversion, acquisition and optimization for all devices.

In the first quarter of 2013, ironSource acquired Israeli advertising technology and network company AfterDownload Ltd. for $28 million to expand its integrated distribution, installation and value-building tools for software developers, publishers and advertisers.

In August 2013, Ironsource announced merger talks with advertising company Babylon, but the deal was called off after Babylon lost high-value contracts with Google and Yahoo due to violations.

In 2013, IronSource purchased browser add-on startup DealPly.

Also in August 2013, ironSource opened an office in San Francisco. In May 2014, they opened an office in Beijing, China. In April 2015, ironSource opened an office in the United Kingdom.

In Fall 2014, ironSource raised approximately $85 million from a group of international investors and acquired the mobile game studio Upopa. At this time, IronSource was considered a key company in Israel's 'Download Valley'.

In September 2015, ironSource merged Supersonic into its mobile operation for a price estimated to be $200 million. The new organization rebranded itself as ironSource.

In June 2016, ironSource announced the acquisition of Sequoia-backed video technology company StreamRail.

In August 2017, ironSource was reported to be "in advanced talks" to be bought for $1.8 billion by a consortium of investment funds.

In October 2019, CVC Capital Partners acquired a minority stake in ironSource for over $400 million.

In February 2020, ironSource announced the launch of its new mobile game studio, Supersonic Studios. Within a couple of months, Supersonic Studios "scored three games in the top 10 mobile charts", with their games amassing more than 35 million downloads.

In January 2021, ironSource acquired mobile advertisement quality measurement company Soomla.

In February 2021, ironSource acquired Luna Labs, the creative management platform and creator of mobile advertisement creation tools like Luna Playable and Luna Replay.

On June 29, 2021, ironSource went public via a merger with an SPAC backed by private equity firm Thoma Bravo Advantage.

In July 2022, Unity Technologies agreed to buy ironSource in an all-stock deal worth US$4.4 billion. On completion of the deal, Unity shareholders owned about 73.5% of the combined company, and former ironSource shareholders kept about 26.5%. The deal was met with criticism from game developers due to ironSource's affiliation with malware. Unity completed the buyout in November 2022.

== InstallCore ==
In February 2011, the company released its first product, InstallCore, as an open-source SDK for a cross-platform installer creation tool and advertisement-delivery platform. InstallCore was observed to use stealth techniques to avoid observation by anti-virus and other security software, and to bypass validation checks by signing programs with illegitimate security certificates. This was classified as a Potentially Unwanted Application by Sophos in 2014 and by Microsoft Essential in 2015, with Malwarebytes identifying the program as "a family of bundlers that installs more than one application on the user's computer". The product was discontinued in 2020 and was no longer supported by the company.

== Applications ==
In September 2014, ironSource acquired gaming company Upopa.

ironSource was one of the first mobile SDK providers to support augmented reality advertisements for game developers.

On October 3, 2018, ironSource released an advertisement revenue measurement tool that allowed developers to measure the effectiveness of advertisement campaigns aligned with other similar tools used amongst developers as a means of evaluating return on advertisement spend (ROAS).

== See also ==
InMobi

AdMob
