= Trivia Crack =

2013 video game

Trivia Crack Preguntados
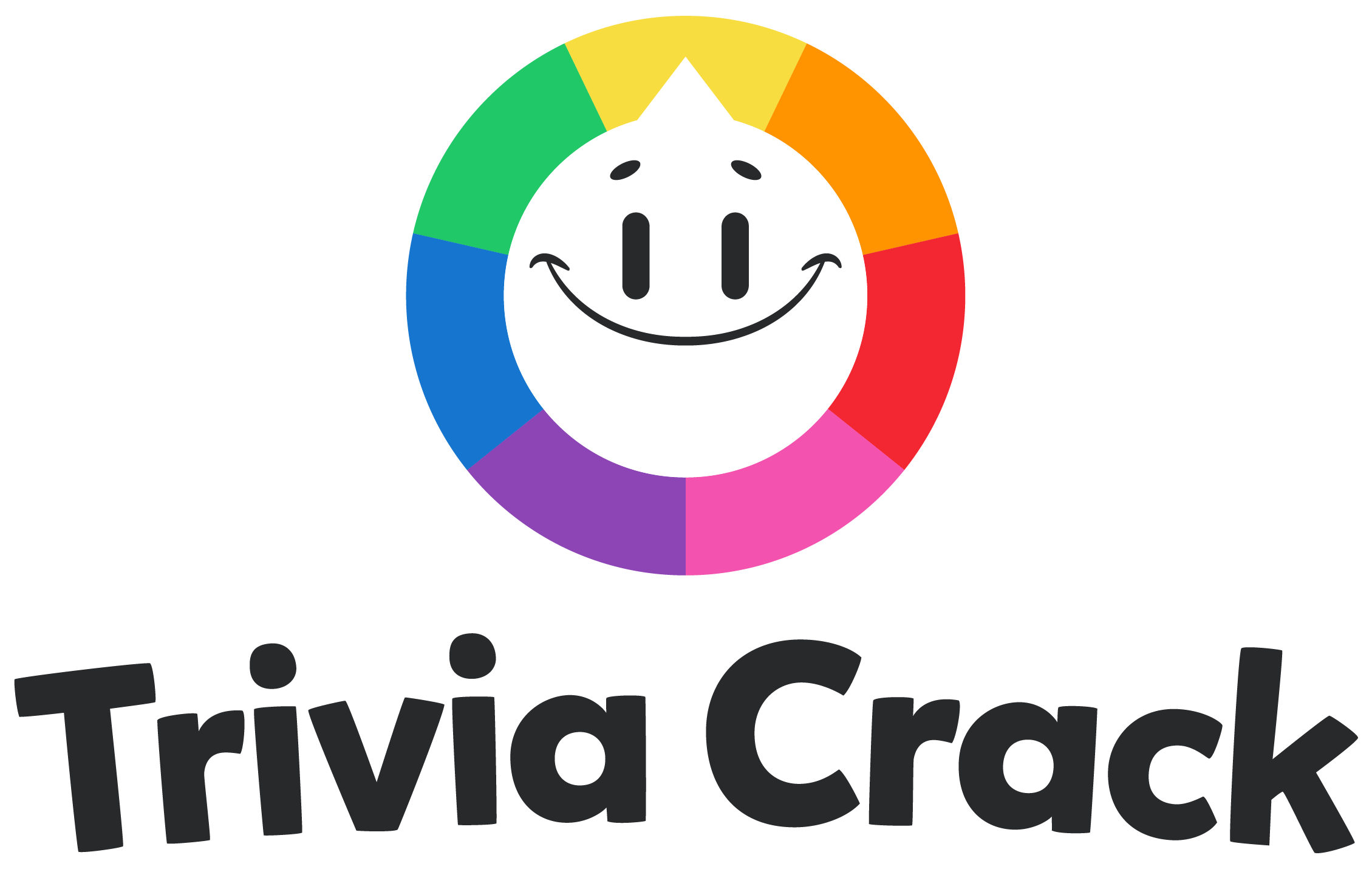
- Logo
- Developer: Etermax
- Publisher: Etermax
- Directors: Maximo Cavazzani (CEO and Founder of Etermax)
- Platforms: iOS; Android; Amazon Fire OS; Windows Phone; Facebook; Google Assistant; Amazon Alexa; Twitch; Apple Watch; CrazyGames
- Release: Android; October 26, 2013 iOS; November 6, 2013; Amazon App Store; May 17, 2014; Windows Phone; September 18, 2014; CrazyGames; 2023
- Genre: Trivia
- Modes: Multiplayer

Trivia Crack (original Spanish language name: Preguntados) is a trivia-based knowledge game developed by Etermax. Initially release for Android and iOS in 2013, In addition to the original game it contains sequels, such as: Trivia Crack 2 and Trivia Crack Adventure, among others, available on Android and iOS. Trivia Crack has more than 600 million downloads worldwide and more than 150 million active users annually, including those who are entertained and connect with others through social networks, such as Facebook or Instagram, with the skill of Alexa of Amazon and the Apple Watch version. Trivia Crack is available in more than 180 countries, ranking #1 in trivia games in 125 of them. Board games, consumer products and experiences, as well as the animated series Triviatopia, and the interactive game show Trivia Quest, inspired by its characters, complete the experience.

Etermax whose teams are located in the Americas and Europe. In March 2023, Trivia Crack was introduced to instant browser gamers worldwide by CrazyGames.

== Characters and Categories ==
- Tito, a blue planet Earth representing the category "Geography"
- Albert, a green laboratory flask representing the category "Science"
- Bonzo, an orange rugby football ball representing the category "Sports"
- Hector, a yellow armour/knight representing the category "History"
- Pop, a pink popcorn bag representing the category "Entertainment"
- Tina, a red paintbrush representing the category "Art"
- Andy, a crown representing the purple category, which gives you choice to select a category

== Sequels ==
=== Trivia Crack 2 ===
In 2018, Etermax launched Trivia Crack's sequel, Trivia Crack 2, that adds more game modes than the original version. And in Trivia Crack 2 (in early 2024) came Trivia Factory.

=== Trivia Crack Adventure ===
Trivia Crack Adventure launched in 2021. The game has the same premise, but with elements of a board game, like the Mario Party series.

== Adaptations ==
=== Triviatopia ===
Launched in September 2019, Triviatopia is the animated series based on Trivia Crack characters, aimed to children. It is composed of 20 episodes that are 2 minutes each, in which Tito, Hector, Pop, Al (Alison), Bonzo and Tina ask a question and travel in time and space to learn in each of their journeys. The show stars Dwayne Hill, Rob Tinkler, Adrian Truss, Katie Griffin, Linda Ballantyne and Kristin Fairlie.

=== Trivia Quest ===
Trivia Quest, a daily interactive game show based on Trivia Crack, premiered on Netflix on April 1, 2022. The premise follows the viewer helping Willy trying to defeat Rocky and rescue his 10 friends, Tina, Bonzo, Andy, Tito, Sweetie, Hector, Pop, Mark, Albert and Paige.
