= CrazyGames =

Belgian gaming platform

Current logo used

CrazyGames is a Belgium-based, globally operating game website specializing in online games that can be played in-browser. The platform has about 4,500 games available across a variety of genres and categories, ranging from action to puzzle and sports games, as well as solo or multiplayer games.The website is available in Desktop, Android and iOS.

CrazyGames was founded by brothers Raf and Tomas Mertens in 2014 and is headquartered in Leuven, Belgium. CrazyGames is the leading provider of web games in the US and one of the leaders worldwide.

== History ==
Brothers Raf and Tomas Mertens founded CrazyGames in 2014 as a hobby project. In 2015, Tomas left the company to focus on other projects. In 2018, the company joined the incubator start it AlexandreConcon. The website grew rapidly and reached the 35 million unique users mark since 2024.

In October 2018, a prototype developer platform was launched. With this, the company wanted to build a developer community and provide game developers with an initial audience for their games. With the platform, developers can upload their games themselves on CrazyGames.

The company has continued to grow rapidly since then.

== Growth ==
In November 2018, CrazyGames was nominated as one of ten "rising stars" by Deloitte Belgium. The Rising Star competition is part of the Deloitte Technology Fast 50 competition, an annual selection of the 50 fastest growing and innovative technology companies.

In 2019, CrazyGames ranked seventh of Deloitte's 2019 Fast 50 ranking with a growth rate of 1,216.09%. One year later, in 2020, the company moved up to fourth with a growth rate of 1,667.75%. They were also nominated and ranked in the Deloitte Fast 50 in 2021.

In September 2023 CrazyGames was nominated among the 50 fastest-growing Belgian technology companies, an acknowledgment announced by Deloitte. This nomination highlights CrazyGames' rapid growth and significant impact within the tech industry.

Late 2025: Grew from 37 to 47 employees, with ongoing hiring for their mobile app and developer tools

This team expansion coincided with a financial boost, as Smartfin invested over 10 million euros, demonstrating strong investor confidence and providing the resources needed to accelerate growth and innovation.

In March, Financial Times recognized CrazyGames among the top 1000 fastest-growing European companies.

April saw CrazyGames featured on Fortune.com, highlighting its integration of AI technologies which positions the company at the forefront of the European startup scene.

Further solidifying its reputation, CrazyGames was also mentioned in an April 2024 Financial Times article as a strong figure within the Belgian startup scene. This acknowledgment reflects the company’s stability and adaptability in maintaining growth and innovation amidst fluctuating economic conditions.

== Product ==
The platform is freely accessible through any web browser. Games can be played without an installation. Users can register an account, but this is optional.

CrazyGames makes money from programmatic advertisements and in-game purchases through a partnership with in-game payment provider Xsolla.

In 2018 CrazyGames launched a self serving platform for game developers, allowing anybody to submit a game to the website.

Game developers can submit their games to CrazyGames in a self-service model and receive a share of the revenue that their games generate.

The games are reviewed by a team of Quality Assurance Specialists against CrazyGames’s quality guidelines.

The company provides a software development kit to add in-game functionality such as advertisements, persistent game progress, accounts, purchases and more. This kit is available for various game engines including Unity, Cocos Creator, Godot, and others.

Games on CrazyGames use HTML5 web technologies such as WebAssembly, WebGL, and WebGPU. Its founder, Raf Mertens, is a vocal proponent of WebGPU and the potential for disruption that this technology holds for the casual gaming sector.

In celebration of its 10th anniversary in October 2023, CrazyGames launched "CrazyGames Originals," a new initiative to develop and host original browser games exclusive to their platform.

== Partnerships ==
CrazyGames is a partner of Canadian video game development studio and game publisher Blue Wizard Digital, as Shell Shockers, Blue Wizard's most popular game, surpassed 35 million game plays on CrazyGames portals in August 2021.

In September 2022, CrazyGames formed a strategic partnership with Playable Factory, a Turkish company renowned as one of the leading global creators of playable ads.

In March 2023, CrazyGames published Trivia Crack and made it available, for the first time, to instant browser gamers worldwide. The game has more than 600 million downloads worldwide and more than 150 million active users annually, besides being available in more than 180 countries, ranking first in trivia games in 125 of them.

On May 23, 2023, CrazyGames entered into a partnership with Kwalee, aiming to bring mobile titles to the web. The move will allow players to play these previously mobile-only titles via their web browser, with no download required. As a result, 11 Kwalee titles were added.

At the same time, CrazyGames introduced a software development kit guide tailored specifically for Cocos Creator developers. This initiative, detailed in a post on the official Cocos website, aims to provide Cocos developers with resources and tools for integration of their games onto the CrazyGames platform.

In July 2023, CrazyGames promoted Rafael Morgan to VP of Marketing and Partnerships.

August 2023 saw the launch of popular games Agar.io and Ludo Club under CrazyGames’ banner. The company was also named as the greatest collection of flash games by Wired, acknowledging their efforts to preserve and continue the legacy of flash-based gaming in the post-Flash era.

In March 2021, CrazyGames published Bloxd, which quickly rose to one of their most popular games, with over a million player votes as of June 2026.

== Sponsorships ==
CrazyGames is an active supporter of the web game development ecosystem, including sponsorships of JS13kgames, Global Game Jam, and talks at Pocket Gamer Connects and Game Developers Conference.

== Platform ==
CrazyGames attracts more than 31 million users each month to its platform, as reported by sources such as De Tijd and Google Ads.

The website focuses on games for children, teenagers, and adults. The platform is one of the ten largest free browser gaming platforms worldwide. While the primary focus is on the English-speaking market, the platform also offers quite a few localized versions (24 in total). The platform allows game developers to publish and monetize HTML5 games that may or may not use the technology WebGL.

== Reception ==
CrazyGames has received generally positive reception.

Wired praised it for having “the greatest collection of flash games”, acknowledging their efforts to preserve and continue the legacy of flash-based gaming in the post-Flash era.

Yahoo Lifestyle praised its “prolific puzzle section”.

== Games ==
Bloxd.io, Cut The Rope, Ragdoll Archers, Fairyland Merge, Jelly Dash, Cubidle, Smash Karts, Global City, Goal Gang, Papa Louie Games
