= Yina Moe-Lange =

Danish alpine skier

Personal information
- Born: May 22, 1993 (age 33) Tokyo, Japan
- Height: 5 ft 2 in (1.57 m)
- Website: Yina.dk

Skiing career
- Sport: Alpine skiing
- Disciplines: Downhill, super-G, giant slalom, slalom, combined

Olympics
- Teams: 1

Yina Moe-Lange (born May 22, 1993, in Tokyo) is a Danish 2010 Olympian alpine ski racer. She was born in Tokyo, Japan where she skied first time at Mount Zaō when she was 3. Her mom's job as a diplomat had previously brought the family to Tokyo, Japan. At age 4 she spoke fluently Japanese. That was also the time when her family relocated to California.

== California and Washington ==
With Lake Tahoe and its ski resorts in the vicinity skiing quickly became her family's favorite pastime. At age 7, Moe-Lange joined the Alpine Meadows Development team. It was with this team she first started organized ski racing in the Tahoe League. She quickly got a taste for ski racing and soon won her first USSA Far West race at Squaw Valley in 2003. Earlier that year she had switched to a full-time race team, Auburn Ski Club, to focus more on racing.

In 2005 her family moved to Seattle in the Pacific Northwest. The two first years she skied with the Crystal Mountain Alpine Club before switching to Team Alpental located at The Summit at Snoqualmie a mere 30 minute drive from her home. As a longtime US resident and a member U.S. Ski and Snowboard Association (USSA), Moe-Lange often travels and trains with regional US elite teams.

Moe-Lange won her first FIS ski race in giant slalom on January 2, 2010, in Keyston, Colorado. On this occasion she became the youngest Danish alpine skier ever to win an international FIS competition at the age of 16 years and 225 days.

As of July 1, 2010 Moe-Lange has a world rank of 292 in the Alpine Downhill event.

On September 25, 2010, Moe-Lange was presented the Sports Award 2010 (Årets Sportspris) by Her Royal Highness Princess Marie of Denmark.

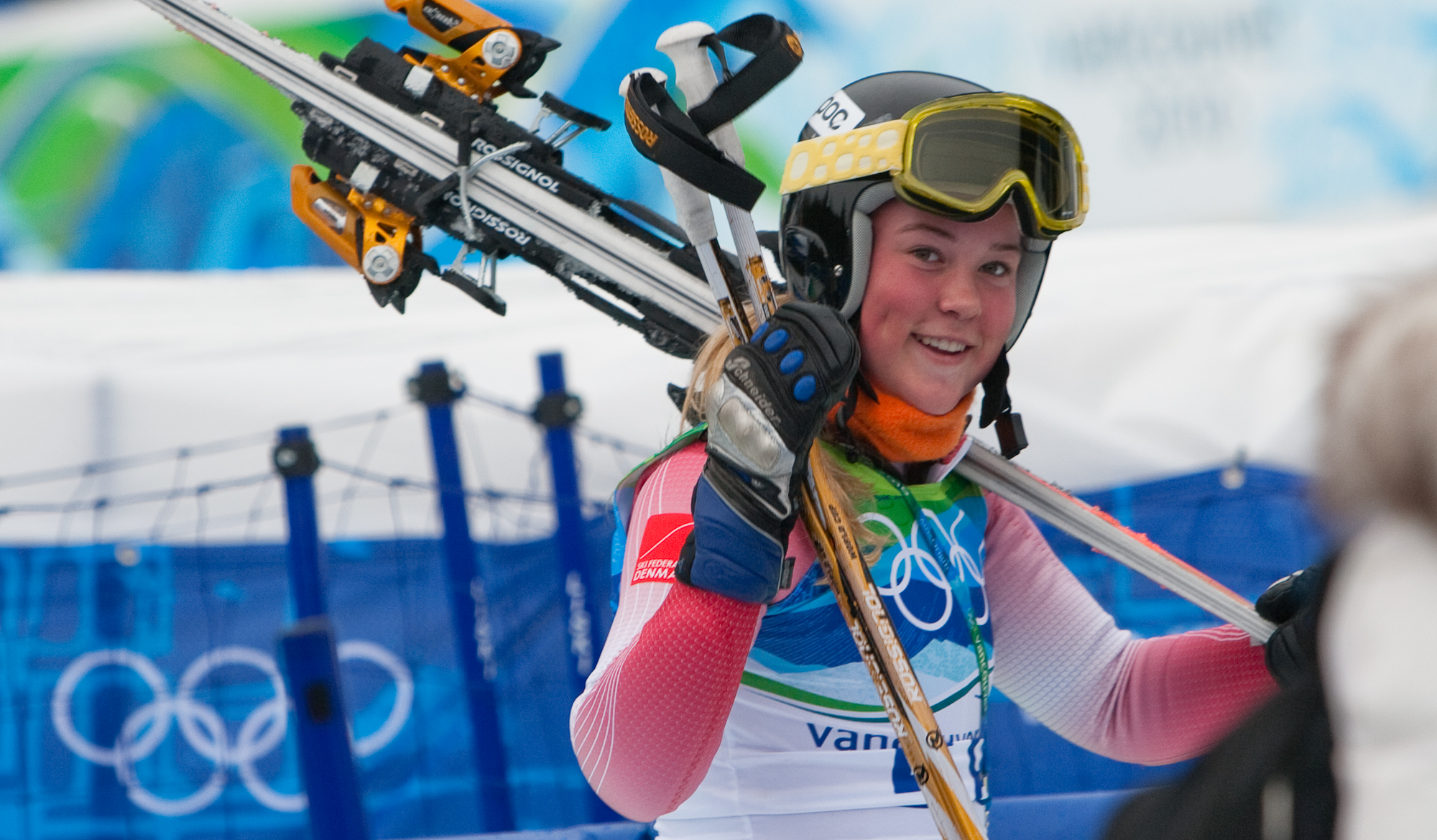
Yina Moe-Lange after her GS race at the Vancouver Olympics.

== Other sports ==
Skiing is not the only sport she participates in. Until recently, she played soccer on a Crossfire select team and ran Cross Country and track for Skyline High School. She is looking forward to run Cross Country in the fall of 2010 when will be team captain for the Skyline High School team.

== The Vancouver Olympics ==
On January 21, 2010, Yina Moe-Lange was selected by the Danish National Olympic Committee to participate in alpine skiing events of giant slalom and slalom at the Vancouver 2010 Winter Games. On February 18, 2010, NBC affiliate King 5 broadcast a short portrait of Moe-Lange from Whistler, Canada. At the Olympic competitions, she finished number 47 in Women's giant slalom in the time of 2:43.67 and she finished number 52 in Women's slalom in the time of 2:04.70.
