= Bible Gateway =

Website for reading the Bible

- Current logo for Bible Gateway

- Screenshot of BibleGateway homescreen
- Available in: 74 languages
- Headquarters: 501 Nelson Place, Nashville, Tennessee, 37214
- Owners: Gospel Communications (1995–2008); Zondervan (2008–present)
- Creator: Nick Hengeveld
- Website: biblegateway.com
- Commercial: Yes
- Registration: Optional
- Launched: 1993; 33 years ago
- Current status: Online

Bible Gateway is an evangelical Christian website designed to allow for easy reading, listening, studying, searching, and sharing of the Bible in many different versions and translations, including English, French, Spanish, and other languages. The website is free to use, but also offers Bible Gateway Plus, a membership program with enhanced services. It is currently owned by Zondervan.

Bible Gateway's engagement features include the ability to display a single Bible verse in many English Bible translations, the ability to display and compare up to five Bible translations side by side at once, its daily Blog, more than 60 email devotions, Bible reading plans and verses-of-the-day, a free mobile app, audio Bibles, video interviews, Bible reference books, shareable widgets, advanced search tools, Bible Gateway Blogger Grid, a retail store, and the Bible Gateway Deals discount program. Bible Gateway's online bookstore offers more than 500,000 Christian resources. It is an affiliate of Christianbook.com.

== History ==
Founded by Nick Hengeveld in 1993 at Calvin College, Grand Rapids, Michigan, Bible Gateway was initially planned as a static HTML presentation of the Bible. In 1995, the site moved to the new Gospel Communications Network (a part of Gospel Communications International). The Bible Gateway website was originally written as a CGI script in Perl. Later versions were written in C++, PHP, and Ruby.

Bible Gateway gradually expanded its database by acquiring the rights to more English and foreign language translations, including translations published by International Bible Society, The Lockman Foundation, and Wycliffe Global Alliance.

In late 2008, Zondervan (the Evangelical Christian publisher of the NIV and TNIV Bible and a wholly owned subsidiary of HarperCollins) acquired Bible Gateway from Gospel Communications. The sale of the site came after two years of continued financial difficulties on the part of the donation-driven GospelCom ministry.

In June 2009, Joseph Park was hired as president of BibleGateway.com. Park was co-founder and former CEO of Kozmo.com, which was the subject of the documentary film e-Dreams. He was also co-founder and former CEO of Askville, which was owned by Amazon and closed in 2013.

In May 2010, Rachel Barach replaced Park (who became Senior Vice President of Consumer Products at parent company HarperCollins Digital, Consumer) as General Manager of Bible Gateway.

As of November 2021, Bible Gateway hosts 232 versions of the Bible, in 74 different languages. Its Alexa ranking was #744.

In September 2025, undisclosed "technical issues" resulted in Bible Gateway being "unavailable to consumers in the United Kingdom and European Union". The company stated that they were "working on a new solution". Later in the month the website was accessible again both in the United Kingdom and the EU. As of September 2026, the main Bible Gateway site remains accessible in the European Union, while certain pages in the "Encyclopedia of the Bible" section still display a message stating that Bible Gateway is unavailable in the region.
