= Comparison of Q&A sites =

The following is a list of websites that follow a question-and-answer format. The list contains only websites for which an article exists, dedicated either wholly or at least partly to the websites.

For the humor "Q&A site" format first popularized by Forum 2000 and The Conversatron, see Q&A comedy website.

Website	Founded	Closed	Description/focus	Languages available	Copyrighting of user contributions	Registration required?	Price
Answers.com	2005	—	All topics	English		Free	
Ask.fm	2010	2024	Social topics	49 languages		Yes	
Askbot	2009	N/A	varies	varies		varies	
Ask MetaFilter	2003	—	Many topics	English	All posts are copyright to their original authors.	No to browse, yes to contribute	
Avvo	2006	—	Legal	English		Yes	
Baidu Knows	2005	—	Many topics	Chinese		No to browse, yes to contribute	
BlikBook	2010	N/A	Local academic	English		Yes	
Blurtit	2006	—	All topics	English		Yes	
Brainly	2009	—	Academic	12 languages	Contributed content owned by its author(s)	No to browse, yes to contribute	
Brilliant.org	2013	—	Science, technology, math	English	User retains ownership; Brilliant can use, distribute, modify.	Yes/Paid	$599.99 for life time use
ChaCha	2006	2016	Many topics	English	Owned by ChaCha	N/A	
Chegg	2005	—	Academic	English	Owned by Chegg Inc.	Yes / paid	
eNotes	2005	—	Academic	English	Owned by eNotes.com	Yes / paid	$14.99/month; $49.99/year
Experts-Exchange	1996	—	Information technology			Yes / paid	
Fixya	2005	—	Consumer products	English		Yes	
Google Answers	2002	2006		English		Yes	
Google Questions and Answers	2007	2014	Many topics	Russian, Chinese, English, French		N/A	
Gutefrage.net	2006	—		German		Yes	Free
HealthTap	2011	—	Health information	English		No	
Internet Oracle	1989	—	All topics (humorous)	English		No	
Jelly	2013	2017	All topics	English			
Knowledge IN	2002	—	Many topics	Korean			
LinkedIn Answers	2007	2013	Business			Yes	
MadSci Network	1995	—	Science	English			
Mahalo.com	2007	2014	Many topics	English		N/A	
Ответы@Mail.Ru	2006	—		Russian			
ProfNet	1992	—	Journalists	English		Yes	
Quora	2009	—	Many topics	22 languages	Contributions owned by the author. Quora granted "worldwide, non-exclusive, royalty-free license" to content use, distribution, or modification.	Yes, except to view single answers	Free
Reddit	2005	—	All topics	Depends on subreddit		No to browse, yes to contribute	
Sharecare	2009	—	Health and wellness	English		No	
Spring.me (formerly Formspring)	2009	2015	All topics	English		Yes	
Stack Exchange	2008	—	Many topics	English (Q&A about other languages takes place in those languages as well as English)	Contributions owned by the author. Contributions "perpetually and irrevocably licensed to Stack Exchange under the Creative Commons Attribution Share Alike license".	No to browse and answer, yes to ask and contribute fully. Some topics allow asking as a guest.	
Stips	2006	—	All topics	Hebrew		Yes	
The Straight Dope	1973 (print)	2018	Many topics	English		No	
Transtutors	2007	—	Academic	English	Owned and operated by Transweb Educational Services	Yes / paid	
TXN (The Experts Network)	2011	?	Sports	English		No	
Uclue	2007	2017	Many topics	English		Yes	
WikiAnswers	2002	2018	Many topics		Subsumed by Answers.com (one of several concurrent URLs)		
English Wikipedia Reference Desk	2004	—	Many topics	English	CC-BY-SA 3.0 and GFDL dual license	No	
Yahoo! Answers	2005	2021	All topics	13 languages	Contributions owned by the author. Yahoo retains rights to the use, distribution or modification.	No	
Zhihu	2011	—	Many topics	Chinese and a few others	Owned and operated by the original authors.	Yes, except to view answers of questions when directed from search engine	

== See also ==
- Comparison of Internet forum software
- Educational Technology
- List of Internet forums
- Knowledge market
- Q&A software – includes a comparison of self-hostable Q&A software
