= Q&A =

Q&A, or question and answer, may refer to:

== Arts and entertainment ==
=== Film and television ===
- Q & A (film), a 1990 American crime drama film
- "Q&A" (The Batman), a 2004 episode of the TV series
- "Q&A" (Homeland), a 2012 episode of the TV drama
- "Q&A" (Person of Interest), a 2015 episode of the TV drama
- "Q&A" (Prodigal Son), a 2019 television episode
- "Q&A" (Star Trek: Short Treks), a 2019 episode of the TV series
- Q&A (American talk show)
- Q+A (Australian talk show)
- Q+A, New Zealand talk show

=== Other uses in arts and entertainment ===
- Q & A (novel), by Vikas Swarup, 2005
- Q and A (manga), a 2009 Japanese manga series
- "Q&A" (Drake song), 2026
- Q&A (Hyuna song), 2024
- "Q&A", a 2019 song by Cherry Bullet from Let's Play Cherry Bullet
- Q&A comedy website

== Other uses ==
- Question and answer system, an online software program that attempts to answer its users' questions
- Q&A (Symantec), database and word processing software

== See also ==
- QA (disambiguation)
- Qaa (disambiguation)
- QNA (disambiguation)
- Question and Answer (disambiguation)
- Questions and answers (disambiguation)
- FAQ, frequently asked questions
- Quiz, a form of game or mind sport
- QANDA, an AI-based learning platform
- Comparison of Q&A sites
