= Blik (disambiguation) =

Blik, a payment system in Poland

It may also be:

- BLIK, a former futsal club from Nefteyugansk, Russia
- Blik (magazine), Belgian Flemish language gossip magazine about showbiz and television news, with extra attention to scandals
- Maurice Blik (born 1939), British sculptor and past President of the Royal British Society of Sculptors
- Mr. Blik, a main character in the American animated television series Catscratch

== Other uses ==
- BlikBook, an online platform used in higher education to enable improved student engagement
- Oog & Blik, Dutch publisher of comics
- A philosophical concept developed by R. M. Hare to respond to the problem of religious language
