= Genon.ru =

- Website type: Web portal
- Available in: Russian
- Founded: 2003
- Headquarters: Russia
- Industry: Internet information providers
- Website: http://www.genon.ru
- Launched: September 1, 2006
- Current status: Active

Genon (Russian: Гено́н) is a Russian knowledge market public resource, which provides user-curated answers to questions and requested information. Genon allows users to quickly find requested information and find new solutions for natural language processing in computer technology.

== Genon features ==
Answers to questions on Genon.ru are created and curated by registered users on the website, which is free and can be done by anyone.

On their homepage, Genon.ru has 15 unique sections of featured questions, one being “New Answers,” (“Новые ответы” in original Russian) which displays links to recently created answers, and another named “Viewed Answers” (“Просмотренные ответы” in original Russian) where users can view their recent search history.

Also on the homepage is a sidebar that displays 31 alphabetized topics which all answers on the site are sorted into. Clicking on any topic will route the user to a page with two sections, one for the most popular answers on that topic, and one for the most recent answers on that topic.

The site provides cash rewards to authors and editors of answers via a point system. 30 points are awarded to authors of answers for every 1000 times a user views their answer, and points can be converted into real currency after five working days given that 150 points have been accrued on author’s account.

This cash reward system is an independent software solution that is present in Runet, on par with similar internet information providers. Genon.ru is associated with the largest search engine: Mail.ru (answers service Otvet@Mail.ru), Google (Google Questions and Answers).

On Genon.ru, incorrect or inaccurate information can be reported using a “Provide Feedback” button (“Оставить отзыв” in original Russian) that is present underneath every search result. Feedback provided will be sent to the author of the answer so changes can be made. Views on answers with pending feedback reports will cease to yield points for the author until the information has been corrected.

If a question is missing an answer, users can press the “Get an answer to the question” button (“Получите ответ на вопрос” in original Russian) and enter an email address to be notified when the question has been answered. Alternatively, registered users can select the “Get points for answers” button (“Получайте баллы за ответы” in original Russian) and author the answer themselves.
