= TXN =

TXN may refer to:

- TXN, abbreviation for transaction (disambiguation)
- TXN, abbreviation for transcription (genetics)
- txn, abbreviation for Database transaction
- TXN (gene), a gene encoding Thioredoxin
- IATA code for Huangshan Tunxi International Airport, China
- ISO 639 code for the Tarangan language, an Austronesian spoken in Indonesia
- Postal code for Tarxien, Malta
- NASDAQ code for Texas Instruments
- Texas Network, a media company
- Reporting mark for Texas & New Mexico Railway
- The Experts Network, an interactive digital sports network
- TX Network, Japan
