= Askville =

User-driven research site (2006-2013)

- Website type: Collaboration
- Available in: English
- Owner: Amazon.com
- Website: http://askville.amazon.com
- Commercial: yes
- Registration: Required
- Launched: December 8, 2006; 19 years ago
- Current status: Inactive as of October 25, 2013

Askville was a user-driven research site founded by Amazon.com. It was opened to the public on December 8, 2006, and shut down on October 25, 2013.

== History ==
Askville was co-founded by Korean-American former investment banker Joseph Park, previously co-founder of Kozmo.com (closed in 2001), which was funded by Amazon.com.

Askville went into beta testing in October 2006 and launched to the public in November 2007.

In August 2008, members of the Askville community complained of a lack of moderation and participation from the Askville administrators. In response, Askville appointed a community manager to track and handle user feedback, and the site management made a commitment to more effectively enforce their policies. The voting system underwent a major revision, including the addition of anonymous voting.

In December 2008, Amazon announced that work on Questville, a planned addition to Askville, would be postponed indefinitely. In 2011, Amazon filed a new trademark application on Questville, and reactivated the Questville blog.

On March 23, 2012, the staff announced that after almost seven years, Askville Bonus questions would cease being offered to Amazon Mechanical Turk in early April 2012 due to a change in operating strategies. On April 13, 2012, Askville staff posted a "Farewell from Askville Team".

On October 25, 2013, the "askville.com" website was shut down. The historic contents of Askville were accessible at askville.amazon.com through early 2016.

== Description ==
Unlike Google Answers (2002–2006), Askville was designed to run much like a computer game. Users would gain or lose "experience points" in particular topics if their answers were good. Users also received "quest gold" by asking and answering questions, and by voting on the worth of other people's answers. Those coins could be redeemed for items in an Askville store.

Unlike other question-and-answer sites, Askville evolved into a social community as well as an information site. This was primarily due to the discussion boards, where "Askvillians" entered into long discussions sparked by individual questions. Though sparked by the questions, discussions often took on a personality of their own. No "experience points" or "quest gold" were awarded for discussions, but many Askvillians came to value the give-and-take, the bickering, and especially the supportive friendships made there.

The questions were 120 characters-long maximum, with a description field that allowed 1000 characters for full explanation of the question. Questions were tagged for tag-based search capacity. Questions were associated to 2 of the 6 topics covered by Askville.

== Askville Awards ==
Askville launched the Askville Awards in April 2009. These awards were an attempt by Askville to reward its longstanding and active members and motivate the newer members. There were several different awards, including the Veteran Award and the Orientation Award. The former was for members who had been with Askville for a year or more, and the latter was for the members who were new to the site. Awards showed up on the public profiles of all members.

== See also ==
- Askalo
- Yahoo! Answers
- Answers.com
