= Google Question Hub =

Knowledge market platform by Google

- Website type: Knowledge market
- Available in: English, Hindi, Indonesian
- Owner: Google
- Website: questionhub.google.com
- Registration: Yes
- Launched: 2019
- Current status: Closed on Jan 15, 2023

Google Question Hub (GQH) is a knowledge market platform developed and offered by Google. As part of reducing non-existent digital media backlog, it uses various but not-known search algorithms to collect unanswered web search queries for content creators, including journalists. GQH is accessible via a registered Google search console account with a verified web property as contradict to Google Questions and Answers. However, searchers do not need to be registered with search console except a google account.

Google search users ask a question in specified languages such as English, Hindi and Indonesian language, and after collecting the unanswered questions, Google lists them in GQH where publishers can then use them as the basis for new publishing articles.

Google posted a message after you login at questionhub.withgoogle.com that says “As of January 5, 2023, the Question Hub beta will end. If you’d like to retain a copy of your data, you can do so via Google Takeout up until March 6, 2023. After that date, Question Hub user data will be deleted.”

== History ==
In 2019, Google Question Hub was initially released in beta version and available in India, Indonesia, and Nigeria. It was first reported by the news media in late 2019. The actual launch date is not known.
