= Transactive =

Transactive may refer to:

- Transactive communication
- Transactive energy
- Transactive memory

== See also ==
- Transaction (disambiguation)
