= Denis Nevedrov =

Russian futsal player (born 1994)

Personal information
- Full name: Denis Dmitrievich Nevedrov
- Date of birth: 6 April 1994 (age 32)
- Place of birth: Yugorsk, Khanty-Mansi Autonomous Okrug
- Position: Forward

Team information
- Current team: MFK Tyumen

Youth career
- 2010: Gazprom-Ugra U-18
- 2010-2012: Tyumen U-18

Senior career*
| Years | Team | Apps | (Gls) |
| 2012–2014 | Ishim-Tyumen-2 | 57 | (25) |
| 2013–2018 | MFK Tyumen | 173 | (46) |
| 2018–2019 | BLIK | 17 | (8) |
| 2019–now | Tyumen-2 | | |

International career^{‡}
| 2014–2015 | Russia U-21 | 4 | (1) |
| 2021– | Armenia | | |
- * Club domestic league appearances and goals as of 3 July 2019 ‡ National team caps and goals as of 3 July 2019

Denis Dmitrievich Nevedrov (Russian: Денис Дмитриевич Неведров; born 6 April 1994, Yugorsk, Khanty-Mansi Autonomous Okrug), is a professional futsal player who plays for Tyumen-2. Born in Russia, he plays for the Armenia national team, having previously represented the Russia U-21 national team.

== Biography ==
Denis Nevedrov started playing futsal since he was 7 years old in Yugorsk, and when he was 16 years he moved to Tyumen futsal club. In 2012–2013 with the second team Ishim-Tyumen-2 he won 1st Division Russian Championships and with the senior team he won a bronze medal in Superleague. After season 2017-2018 he played 17 games for BLIK (Nefteyugansk) in Superleague 2018/2019. Nevedrov was in the squad for Tyumen, but now he plays in Tyumen-2.

== Honours ==
- In MFK Tyumen:
  - Bronze Superleague 2012/2013
- In Ishim-Tyumen-2:
  - Winner 1st Division Russian Championships 2012/2013
- In BLIK (Nefteyugansk):
  - Silver International tournament of Tyumen region 2018
