= QNA =

QNA or QnA may refer to:

== Groups, organizations, and companies ==
- Qatar News Agency
- Queen Air (ICAO airline code QNA), a Dominican airline
- Qimonda North America, a division of Qimonda semiconductor company
- QinetiQ North America, a division of QinetiQ defense contractor

== Electronics, computing, and telecom ==
- Question and answer system, an online software program that attempts to answer its users' questions
- MSN QnA, a Microsoft question-and-answer service
- Queueing Network Analyzer, for packet tracing in analysis of traffic flow (computer networking)
- QNA, one of the QN Signals in Morse code

== Other uses ==
- Qin'an County (division code QNA), Tianshui City, Gansu, China; see List of administrative divisions of Gansu
- Kamurú language (Linguist List language code qna)

== See also ==
- Q&A (disambiguation)
- Question and Answer (disambiguation)
- Questions and answers (disambiguation)
