= Cardella =

Cardella is an Italian surname. Notable people with the surname include:

- Jon Cardella, American businessman
- Lara Cardella (born 1969), Italian writer
- Phil Cardella (born 1976), American mixed martial artist

== See also ==
- Cardelli
