= Stips (website) =

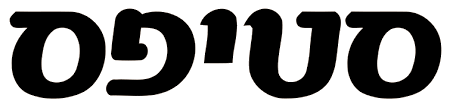
- Website logo
- Native name: סטיפס
- Website type: Q&A Platform
- Available in: Hebrew
- Founded: Dr. Nadav Dafni
- Headquarters: {{{location_country}}}
- Owners: Nadav Dafni - Internet and Software Ltd (נדב דפני - אינטרנט ותוכנה בע"מ)
- Website: https://stips.co.il/
- Launched: 6 February 2006
- Written in: ASP.NET

Stips (Hebrew: סטיפס; transliteration: Stips; literally: "short tips") is an Israeli community-driven question-and-answer (Q&A) website or knowledge market primarily aimed at the youth. The platform enables users to seek and offer anonymous advice on a wide range of topics, including technology, music, academics, and philosophy.

The website was founded in 2006 by Dr. Nadav Dafni, and in 2018, an official Android application was launched. Content moderation is handled by a team of users referred to as "trustees" ("נאמנים"), who are granted special privileges, such as the ability to delete or edit questions. These users often monitor the site for cases that may require police intervention, such as instances of suicide threats or child abuse.

Stips is organized into various categories based on topics and interests. As of recent rankings, the website is placed 45th among the most popular websites in Israel according to SimilarWeb. It also ranks first among Israeli websites in the field of nutrition and fitness.

== History ==
The website was founded in 2006 by Dr. Nadav Dafni, an Israeli entrepreneur and internet figure, as a platform for advice and answering questions.

Initially, the site featured a virtual assistant called "Tiffy," built with flash technology to help users find answers to previously asked questions. "Tiffy" was eventually removed.

In the website's early years, professionals such as dietitians, doctors, psychologists, and lawyers, known as "Stips experts" ("מומחי סטיפס"), were active on the site. Users could even consult them by phone, though their role gradually diminished.

In 2015, Dafni launched "Eureka," an encyclopedia website for children and youth, offering brief content with videos, media, and daily challenges. The encyclopedia was launched as part of "Stips".

In January 2017, the site underwent a redesign. Later that year, the adult and youth sections of the website were merged.

On April 15, 2018, an official Android app was released for the website, along with a new design, interface, and additional features for phone users.

== Site structure ==
'''Stips''' is a Q&A platform featuring a user-generated database of advices, tips, and answers. Content is continuously moderated by the system and a group of volunteers known as "Stips trustees" ("נאמני סטיפס").

Questions are organized into sub-topics called "tags," allowing users to ask questions and receive responses from other community members. Previously, users could choose between asking a question or requesting consultation, and the platform housed a database of curated tips. In 2017, this database was spun off into a separate site called "Discover."

The site is monitored by volunteers who enforce community guidelines, manage user interactions, and oversee content. There are also "senior trustees" ("נאמנים בכירים") who supervise regular "trustees" and handle disputes. As of July 2024, Stips has over 420,000 registered users and hosts more than 17 million questions.

Users can rate answers with upvotes or downvotes, and question askers can reward helpful responses with a "flower". Each user has a "reliability score" ranging from 0 to 100, which influences their site privileges. Scores below certain thresholds may result in temporary or permanent account restrictions.

== Criticism ==
There has been criticism regarding the account deletion process on the website. Users cannot delete their accounts themselves, and even after an account is deleted, the user's personal information remains stored and accessible to the website's system for potential use.

Additionally, most responses on the website are provided by non-professionals, leading to concerns about the accuracy and reliability of the information presented on the website.

In 2021, a report that was submitted to the Knesset Committee by the National Headquarters for the Protection of Children on the Internet (Israeli Hotline 105), revealed that Stips is one of the primary forums where anti-LGBT rhetoric was higher than average. Furthermore, 1,345 suicide-related incidents were reported on Stips during the COVID-19 pandemic.
