= NeighborCity =

Real estate information and service company

- Company type: Private
- Industry: Real Estate Information Services
- Founded: 2007
- Founder: Jonathan Cardella
- Area served: US
- Key people: Jonathan Cardella, Founder and CEO, Ali Vahabzadeh, President and COO
- Parent: American Home Realty Network
- Website: www.neighborcity.com

NeighborCity was a residential real estate information and service company that rated real-estate agents in the United States, offering a way for buyers and sellers of homes to compare and evaluate agents. It was based in San Francisco.

The company rated almost every member of the National Association of Realtors in the United States, based on transaction and listing history. NeighborCity analyzes agents' performance based on closing rate, number of closings, number of active listings, geographic specialization, number of days on market, rate of dual agency, sales price per square foot, and the difference between ask and sale price, for the homes they sell. NeighborCity provides an evaluation of the quality of service delivered by agents, with respect to their clients' interests and relative to competing real-estate agents.

The company also maintained a national database of real-estate listings. The site recommended corresponding independent buy-side real estate agents next to each for-sale listing, along with a performance score and a link to a detailed professional profile for each recommended agent.

NeighborCity ended and its assets were donated to Consumer Advocates in American Real Estate (CAARE).

== History ==
Jonathan Cardella founded NeighborCity in 2007, and he served as the company's chief executive officer. Ali Vahabzadeh was the president and chief operating officer. The company is owned and operated by American Home Realty Network, Inc. (AHRN), a licensed California real estate brokerage.

By 2018 NeighborCity's assets had been donated to the non-profit Consumer Advocates in American Real Estate (CAARE). As of 2021 the NeighborCity url redirects to CAARE.

== Business model ==
NeighborCity used real-estate transaction and listing database information from national sources to construct its rankings. NeighborCity received a portion of the commission earned by brokers on closed transactions that result from referrals.

== Lawsuits over IP rights to listing data ==
=== NAR and MLS suits ===
In March 2012, shortly after NeighborCity provided the public performance rankings of National Association of Realtors members, Metropolitan Regional Information Systems filed a civil lawsuit against AHRN/NeighborCity claiming copyright violations by using MLS real estate listing information to craft its realtor-rating database. Northstar MLS of St. Paul, Minnesota, followed suit with similar litigation in April 2012.

NeighborCity alleged that the suit was brought to prevent buyers and sellers from getting accurate information about the performance of individual brokers., and asserted that the lawsuits had no merit, stating that because the plaintiffs had failed to comply with requirements of the Copyright Act for copyright registration and that information for which the plaintiffs claimed ownership was not subject to copyright.

Initial judicial opinions in both cases addressed the issue of what is subject to copyright protection. The court upheld NeighborCity's claim in determining that the MLS listing data does not qualify for copyright protection because facts, including property features such as "main floor full bath" and "whirlpool," are not protectable works to which the MRIS and Northstar MLS can claim ownership; however, the court found that photographs and property descriptive texts are likely to be copyrightable.

In November 2013, a Maryland Federal District court found that NeighborCity "adequately alleged" a conspiracy among multiple MLSs and the National Association of Realtors.

=== Berkshire Hathaway suit ===
In May 2013, Berkshire Hathaway subsidiary HomeServices of America filed a similar lawsuit against NeighborCity.com for reuse of photos from its (subsidiaries') listings without express permission. NeighborCity filed a countersuit claiming anti-competitive practices. The litigation among the parties included lawsuits in federal courts in Minnesota and North Carolina. HomeServices of America announced settlement of both of these lawsuits in September 2014.

== AgentMatch dispute ==
In November 2013, NeighborCity sent to realtor.com, operator of Move, Inc., a cease-and-desist letter alleging that Move's AgentMatch tool infringed on NeighborCity's trademark of the term "Agent Match" and that the tool potentially infringes on a 2010 patent application filed by NeighborCity.

== See also ==
- Metropolitan Regional Information System, Inc. v. American Home Realty Network, Inc.
