= Locanto =

German online classified ads network

Locanto is a worldwide Locanto only network with areas dedicated to jobs, personals, for rent, for sale, services, community, real estate, vehicles, and pets.

== Background ==
The Locanto Classifieds sites are operated by the German startup company Yalwa located in Wiesbaden, Germany. Locanto was launched in July 2006 with a local classifieds site for New York City. One month later, on August 21, 2006, the service was extended to the U.S. cities of Boston, Chicago, Los Angeles and San Francisco. As of 2007, every major U.S. city has its own accessible site for the Locanto classifieds service. Locanto was created by the German start-up company, Yalwa. Klaus P. Gapp, CEO and founder of Yalwa, previously founded and operated OpusForum.org, a local classifieds site for the German speaking market. OpusForum.org was bought by eBay in 2005 and merged with its classifieds site Kijiji one year later.

== Safety ==
In regards to internet safety, Locanto has established an independent blog on Safer Trading in which safety tips for online trading are shared with users.

=== Mobile and Apps ===
Since February 2010, the Locanto classifieds sites have also been available in mobile version for mobile web users. Browsing and searching classified ads as well as posting a free ad is enabled in the mobile version. Adsdistrict.in mobile site has been blamed for copying Locanto mobile site.

In 2012, the Locanto iPhone App was launched and in 2014, the Locanto Android App was made available. In 2015, the Locanto Classifieds 2.0 iPhone app was released.

== Criticism ==
In January 2010, several Indian media channels reported a story about Kannada actress Sanchita Padukone's pictures having been misused in a personals services ad on Locanto India, naming Locanto a "porn site".

While there is a dedicated version of this site for the Indian market over 60% of the traffic of the American version of the site comes from India.
