= Joseph Park =

Joseph Park may refer to:

- Joseph Park (businessman), American entrepreneur
- Joseph Park (wrestler), a ring name of Christopher Joseph Park
