= Questions and answers =

Questions and answers may refer to:

== Music ==
- Questions & Answers (album), by The Sleeping, 2006
- "Questions and Answers" (Biffy Clyro song), 2003
- "Questions and Answers" (Sham 69 song), 1979
- "Questions and Answers", a song by Nektar from Remember the Future, 1973

== Television ==
- Questions and Answers (TV channel) or Voprosy I Otvety, a Russian game-show channel
- Questions and Answers (TV programme), an Irish topical debate show
- "Questions and Answers" (The Golden Girls), a television episode

== Other uses ==
- Google Questions and Answers, a free knowledge market
- Questions and Answers, a work by Anastasius of Sinai
- Questions and Answers, a seven-volume book by Mirra Alfassa
- Erotapokriseis, Greek for 'questions and answers', a literary genre
- Question and answer system, an online software system

== See also ==
- Question and Answer (disambiguation)
- Q&A (disambiguation)
- QNA (disambiguation)
- Frequently asked questions
- Quiz game
