= Metropolitan Regional Information System, Inc. v. American Home Realty Network, Inc. =

- Court: United States Court of Appeals for the Fourth Circuit
- Decided: July 17, 2013
- Citations: Metro. Reg'l Info. Sys., Inc. v. Am. Home Realty Network, Inc., 722 F.3d 591 (2013).

Case history
- Appealed from: The United States District Court for the District of Maryland Southern Division

Court membership
- Judges sitting: TRAXLER, Chief Judge, and GREGORY and DUNCAN, Circuit Judges

Case opinions
- Decision by: Judge DUNCAN in which Chief Judge Traxler and Judge Gregory joined

Keywords
- cyberlaw·copyright law·Clickwrap

Metro. Reg'l Info. Sys., Inc. v. Am. Home Realty Network, Inc., 722 F.3d 591 (2013)., was a United States Court of Appeals for the Fourth Circuit case in which a court held two issues:

1. The copyright owner of a collective work, such as an automated database, was not required by a pre-suit copyright registration requirement to identify names of creators and titles of individual work.
2. By clicking yes to the term of use and uploading photograph, is sufficient to writing component in assignment of right under 17 U.S.C. § 204

== Background ==
Metropolitan Regional Information Systems Inc. ("MRIS") operates an online multiple listing service which provides property listings and related information to its subscribers, real estate broker and agent. In order to upload their real estate to MRIS database, subscribers have to click "yes" to MRIS Terms of Use Agreement ("TOU") that assigns copyright in each photographs to MRIS.

MRIS registers the database every quarter with the U.S. Copyright Office pursuant to the rules for an automated database. As the basis for each quarterly application, MRIS typically describes the material as "daily updated and revised text and images and new text and images," but does not name or describe individual photos.

American Home Realty Network ("AHRN") operates NeighborCity.com, a national real estate search engine and referral business. The site gets its information by scraping information from the MRIS Database, among other sources.

After failure to make a licensing agreement, MRIS field suit against AHRN and its CEO for copyright infringement and sought for a preliminary injunction. The district court granted a preliminary injunction in the use of MRIS's photographs. AHRN appealed based on two reasons:

1. MRIS failed to register its copyright in the individual photographs;
2. By clicking "yes" to TOU, subscribers did not transfer their copyright in the photographs to MRIS.

== Opinion of Court ==
=== On the copyright registration of a collective work ===
For the first issue, AHRN asserted that MRIS failed to identify names of creators and titles of individual works as required by 17 U.S.C. §§ 409(2)–(6) Therefore, MRIS did not register its interest in the individual photographs. The court stated that 17 U.S.C. § 408 allows a groups registration of related works, such as automated database. As articulated in Craigslist v. 3Taps, the court recognized collective work registration as sufficient if the registrant owns the rights to the component work, because "it would be ... [absurd and] inefficient to require the registrant to list each author for an extremely large number of component works to which the registrant has acquired an exclusive license." In addition, it would add impediments to automated database authors' attempts to register their own component works and would conflict with the general purpose of Section 409, which is encouraging prompt registration. Thus thwarting the specific goal embodied in Section 408 of easing the burden on group registrations. Here, MRIS owned each photographs transferred by the subscriber. Therefore, MRIS satisfied the pre-suit registration requirement.

=== On the Clickwrap agreement ===
The court moved to the other issue, whether clicking "yes" to MRIS's TOU operated as an assignment of copyright in the photographs under 17 U.S.C. § 204.

A transfer of one or more of the exclusive rights of copyright ownership by assignment or exclusive license is not valid unless an instrument of conveyance, or a note or memorandum of the transfer, is in writing and signed by the owner of the rights conveyed or such owner's duly authorized agent

The court noted that 17 U.S.C. § 204 was intended to solve a dispute between owners and transferees, not for the benefit of a third party infringer. E-SIGN Act defines an electronic signature means that: "...an electronic sound, symbol, or process, attached to or logically associated with a contract or other record and executed or adopted by a person with the intent to sign the record." A click on the website could be regarded as signature under the E-SIGN Act. Citing E-SIGN Act, the court stated that this Act can be applied to a copyright case because none of the exception under this Act applies to this case.15 U.S.C. § 7001(b) provides that it "does not ... limit, alter, or otherwise affect any requirement imposed by a statute, regulation, or rule of law ... other than a requirement that contracts or other records be written, signed, or in nonelectric form." Since 17 U.S.C. § 204(a) requires transfers be "written" and "signed,"15 U.S.C. § 7001(b) intended to limit, alter, or otherwise affect of 17 U.S.C. § 204(a). Therefore, the court held that the electronic agreement can satisfy a transfer of right under 17 U.S.C. § 204. Affirmed the District Court's decision.

== Subsequent developments ==
From the decision in this case, by clicking "yes" to the Clickwrap Agreement, a user could agree to transfer his copyright to the websites, other than his intent to agree with the term of use. This could establish some new considerations for practitioners dealing with copyright matters. As more transactions become entirely electronic in nature, it is likely that more courts will join the Fourth Circuit in holding that clicks and taps can constitute signed writings in general business as well as specifically in the copyright context.

The court concluded that subscribers who click "yes" to the Terms of Use Agreement indicate assent via E-sign.However, the court gave no comment on whether such assent would constitute a valid agreement in this appeal to preliminary injunction; therefore, the validity MRIS's copyright transfer might need to further be solved in its merit claims. Whether the accepting in a Clickwrap Agreement should be interpreted that the user consented to transfer his own right is still a controversial issue. In a practical way, it might have to consider if the user is forced to click yes to the Clickwrap Agreement. If so, it might be clearer if the website would use both the clicking to the Term of Use and the signing to assent to transfer the user's right to the website. It should be interesting to see how other courts would decide this same issue.

== See also ==
- National Association of Realtors
- Clickwrap
