= Question and Answer =

Question and Answer may refer to:

- Question and Answer (novel), by Poul Anderson, 1954
- Question and Answer (album), by Pat Metheny, Dave Holland, and Roy Haynes, 1989
- "Question and Answer" (Burn Notice), a television episode

== See also ==
- Questions and answers (disambiguation)
- Q&A (disambiguation)
- QNA (disambiguation)
