= MSN QnA =

- The MSN QnA logo.
- Live Search QnA homepage
- Developer: Microsoft
- Preview release: Beta / March 16th, 2006 to May 21st, 2009
- Type: Knowledge Market
- Website: Archived official website at the Wayback Machine (archive index)

MSN QnA (formerly Live Search QnA and Windows Live QnA, codenamed Answers), was a question and answer service, part of Microsoft's MSN group of services. It is somewhat similar to Google Answers, but closer in function to Yahoo! Answers. Users could ask questions, tag them according to topic, and gain points and reputation for answering other users' questions.

The service was community based; questions are posed to the whole community, rather than just one researcher. At that point there were apparently no plans for any monetary compensation of any kind for answering questions; rather, like with Yahoo! Answers, the only rewards are having high point counts and good reputation. In order to open an account a user needs a Windows Live ID (now Microsoft account).

All questions on MSN QnA were "tagged" by the poster to allow easy searching and navigation.

The MSN QnA beta ended and the website closed on May 21, 2009.

== Levels, Scoring and Reputation System ==
Users are given four days to answer a question. Questions can be rated for their usefulness once a best answer has been selected. The scoring system is weighted to encourage users to participate and answer questions. Scores are awarded by answering questions and voting for answers. Bonus scores are awarded for creating the best answer or voting for the best answer. Generally, the user's QnA score will rise more quickly if their votes are for quality answers. A user is limited to 100 votes per day.

QnA users also have a reputation system under their profile that allows other users to know how likely their answer is a good one, based on the user's past performance. This is shown by the number of stars under their username. This is a lifetime rating, so all users begins with zero stars and as time passes, their reputation will change. The reputation system is based on the number of best answers given over time as a percentage of total answers given. It is also possible to affect a reputation negatively by violating the code of conduct. The account that caused the violation receives moderation and removal of content. Participants that repeatedly violate the code of conduct are moderated to a "Former Member" status and to continue in the forum are required to start a new account and lose all reputation and points from the previous account.

Action	Scores
Sign in to QnA	1
Vote	1
Vote for winning best answer	4
Rate completed question	1
Answer a question	5
Give best answer to a question	20
Violate code of conduct	-50

Level System

1. 20-499 scores
2. 500-999 scores
3. 1,000-1,999 scores
4. 2,000-3,999 scores
5. 4,000-7,999 scores
6. 8,000-14,999 scores
7. 15,000-29,999 scores
8. 30,000-49,999 scores
9. 50,000-99,999 scores
10. 100,000+ scores

== History ==
MSN QnA originally started as a Windows Live-branded service. On 29 April 2008, QnA was rebranded as part of the Live Search family, named Live Search QnA, as part of Microsoft's effort to separate its Bing (then Live Search) developments from the Windows Live services family. On 18 February 2009, the QnA team officially announced that Live Search QnA would soon be rebranded as part of the MSN family of services, focusing on content and community. On 13 March 2009, MSN QnA Beta version was officially released.

On 11 May 2009, the QnA team officially announced the closure of the QnA service, to take place on May 21.
