= Biz Stone =

American blogger and co-founder of Twitter (born 1974)

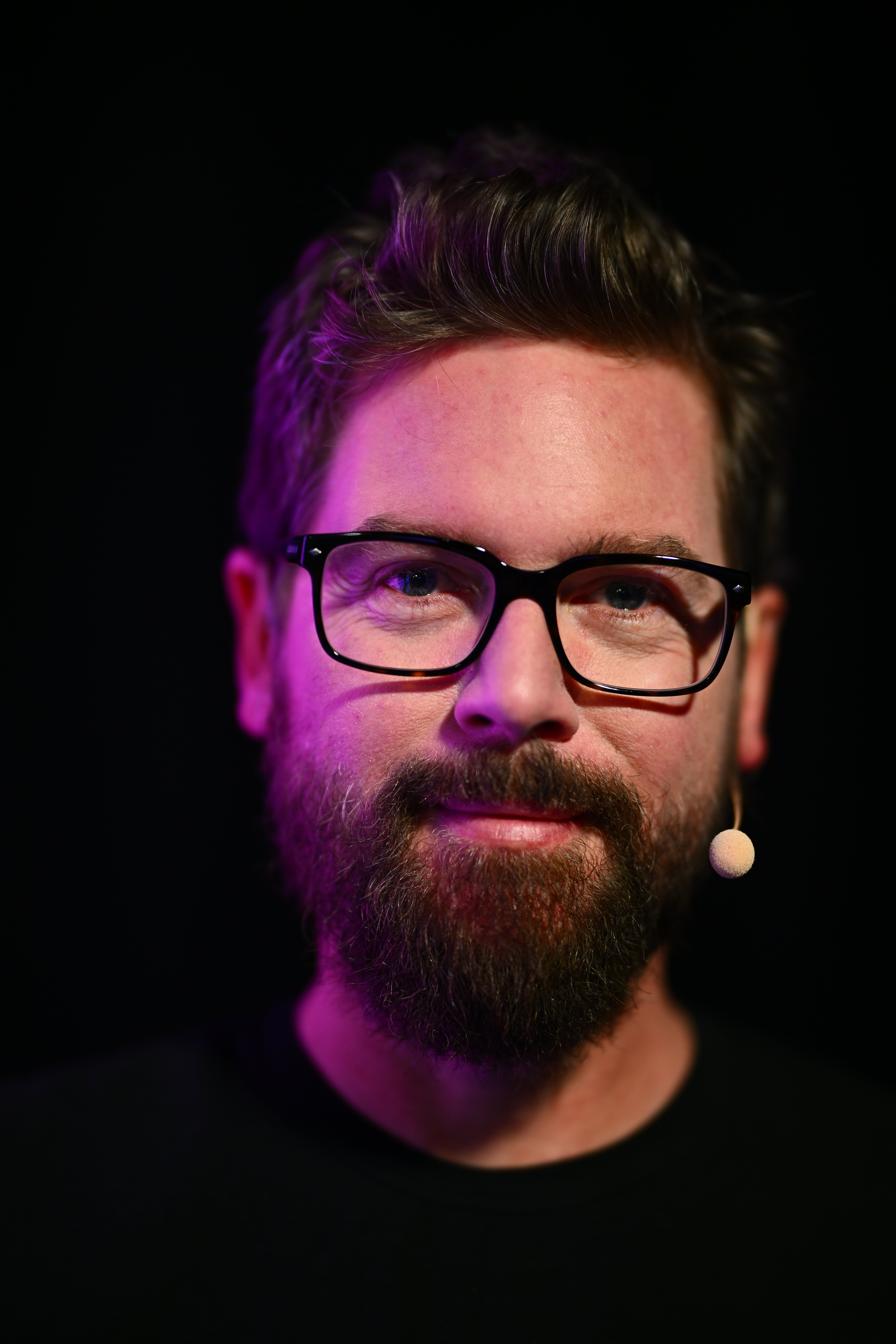
- Stone in 2025
- Born: Christopher Isaac Stone; March 10, 1974 (age 52); Boston, Massachusetts, US
- Education: Northeastern University; University of Massachusetts Boston
- Occupations: Creative director, software engineer, businessperson
- Known for: co-founder of Twitter, Jelly
- Spouse: Livia Stone

Christopher Isaac "Biz" Stone (born March 10, 1974) is an American entrepreneur who is a co-founder of Twitter, among other tech companies. Stone was the creative director at Xanga from 1999 to 2001. Stone co-founded Jelly, with Ben Finkel. Jelly was launched in 2014 and was a search engine driven by visual imagery and discovery. Stone was Jelly's CEO until its acquisition by Pinterest in 2017.

== Education ==
Stone was born in Boston, Massachusetts, in 1974. He graduated from Wellesley High School in Wellesley, Massachusetts. He attended Northeastern University and the University of Massachusetts Boston, but did not graduate from either.

== Career ==
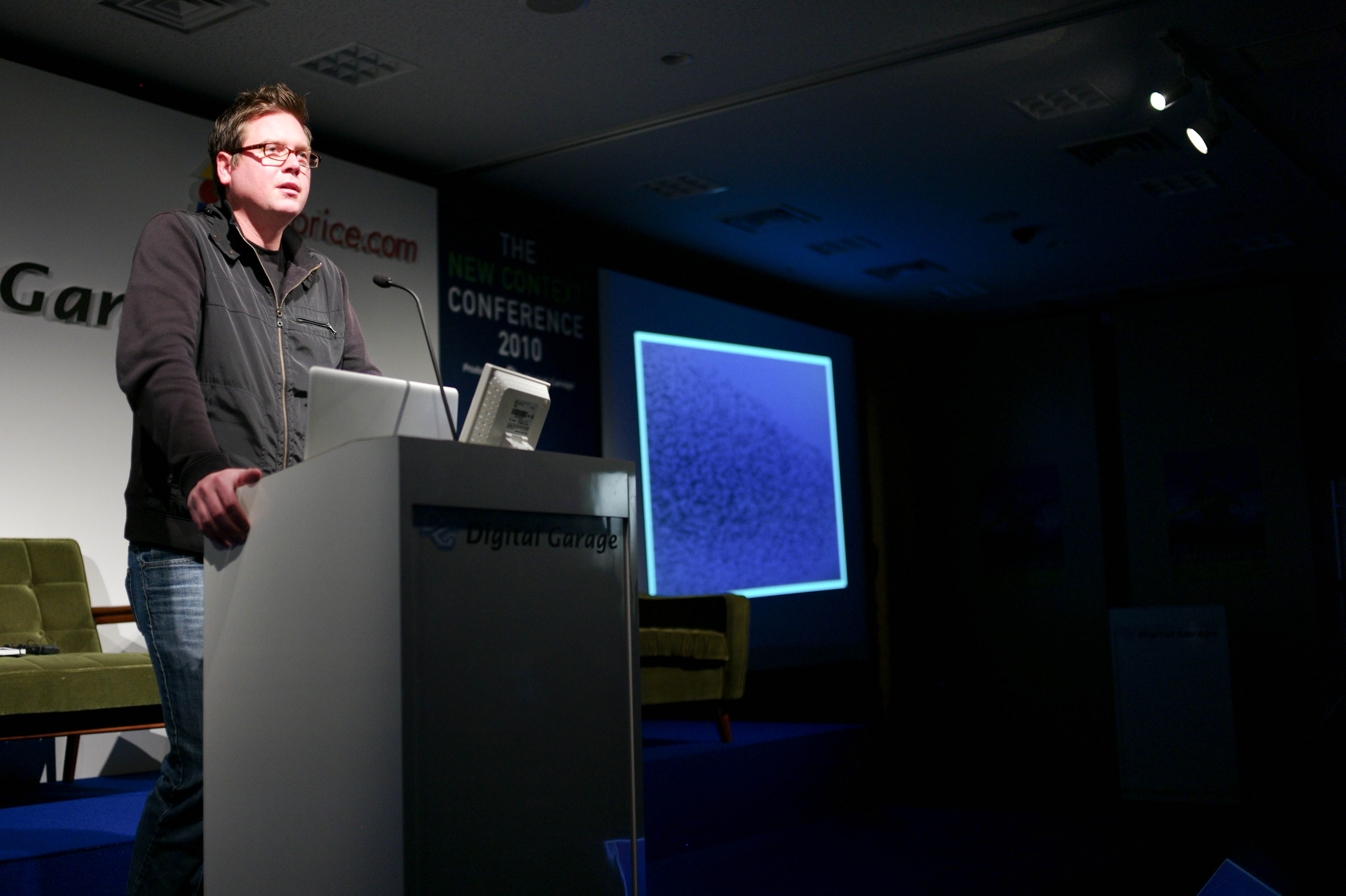
Stone addressing a conference in 2010

Stone started his career moving boxes at Little, Brown and Company while at university in Boston. He was promoted as a book cover designer and left school to work full-time.

From 1999 to 2001, Stone was creative director at Xanga.

He quit Xanga and got a job at Wellesley College for about a year before being invited to work for Google's Blogger team.

From 2003 to 2005, Stone held a senior leadership role at Google.

Stone co-founded the social network Twitter in 2006 and left the company in 2011.

Stone made his directorial debut in 2012, working alongside Ron Howard and Canon USA to direct a short film, Evermore, as a part of Project Imaginat10n. Stone is also an advisor to Zoic Studios, and an Executive Producer of the documentary Eating Animals along with Natalie Portman.

Stone returned to Twitter in 2017 where he remained till 2021.

In 2024, Stone joined the board of directors of social network Mastodon's US nonprofit entity.

Aside from Twitter, Stone is an angel investor and advisor in the startup community having backed companies such as Square, Slack, Medium, Nest, Beyond Meat, Pinterest, Intercom, and Faraday. Stone is a board director at Beyond Meat, Medium, Polaroid Swing, Workpop, and Jelly Industries. Stone is the Chairman of Polaroid Swing.

== Awards and honors ==
Along with Jack Dorsey, Stone holds the patent for inventing Twitter.

Stone has been honored with the International Center for Journalists Innovation Award, Inc. magazine named him Entrepreneur of the Decade, Time listed him as one of the 100 Most Influential People in the World, and GQ named him Nerd of the Year, along with Evan Williams. In 2014, The Economist recognized Stone with an Innovation Award.

In 2015, Stone's Twitter won an Emmy and Stone received CIPR's most prestigious accolade for leadership at the forefront of developing new forms of media.

Stone is a visiting fellow at Oxford University and a member of the Senior Common Room at Exeter College, Oxford. Upon delivering the 2011 commencement, Babson College awarded Stone their highest honorary degree, a Doctor of Laws. and is a Fellow at Oxford University. Stone is an Executive Fellow at University of California, Berkeley.

== Published works ==
Stone has published three books,

- Blogging: Genius Strategies for Instant Web Content (New Riders, 2002),
- Who Let The Blogs Out? (St Martins, 2004), and
- Things A Little Bird Told Me (Grand Central, 2014).

In addition to his long-running personal blog and Medium articles, Stone has published op-eds for The Atlantic and The Times.

== Personal life ==
Stone is Jewish. He is involved in animal rights, veganism, environmentalism, poverty, health and education. Stone is an advisor and contributor to DonorsChoose, a non-profit organization helping classrooms in need.

Stone lives in Marin County, California, with his wife Livia and his son Jacob. He and his wife founded and operate the Biz and Livia Stone Foundation, which supports education and conservation in California.

== See also ==
- Jelly (app)
