= Blurtit =

British Q&A website

- Website type: Q&A website
- Available in: English
- Owner: Blurtit Limited
- Revenue: £2.4m
- Website: www.blurtit.com
- Commercial: no
- Launched: 2006
- Current status: Active

Blurtit is a British Q&A website where people asked questions and a community of regular users provided answers based on their knowledge or opinions. Blurtit was founded in 2006, and was based in Norwich in Norfolk, UK.

Blurtit resembled a social media site as opposed to an information reference site. Contributors were encouraged to enter multi–user discussions and to voice opinions about the questions placed. Questions were typically in the long tail of internet search in that they had a large number of keywords, produced limited results on a search engine, and as such required a live human to answer them. Blurtit covered a diverse range of subjects including social and spiritual matters.

== History ==
Tim O’Shea created and launched Blurtit in 2006 as a new venture in their company, Mindcom Internet Limited. Originally it was intended as an experiment to gauge whether a social based Q & A model would be an effective internet traffic generator. Until then Mindcom's revenue was derived from arbitrage of pay per click advertising rates and affiliate marketing.

By 2008 Blurtit became the company's main source of income. The increase in online traffic mirrored that of peers JustAnswer, Answers.com, Answerbag and Yahoo! Answers. Blurtit's income source was generated solely by contextual advertising that corresponded to the topics being discussed on the site itself.

In 2009 Blurtit started working on the development phase of Qhub, a tool for both experts and novice users with a passion for a particular subject to help them set up their own dedicated Q & A forum. This development was part of the online movement where internet users are generating content. It is similar to other online services, such as Squidoo (articles), WordPress (blogs) and SocialGO (social networks). All of them help people set up their own websites without the necessity of having a high level of technical knowledge. Qhub was officially launched in January 2010, but subsequently ceased operations after a brief trial run in June 2011.

In September 2010, Blurtit averaged 12.5 million visitors a month and, as of May 2011, had in the region of 2 million questions. However, over the course of the next few months, the site merged, quality-controlled and retired some questions so that, as at July 2011, currently there are around 600,000 questions. Also in September 2010, the company renamed itself Blurtit Limited and exited all non Q&A operations.

In November 2019, Blurtit Ltd. applied to Companies House for a voluntary strike off as the IP ownership was sold to another company.
