= Cardelli =

Cardelli is an Italian surname. Notable people with the surname include:

- Alessandro Cardelli (born 1991), Sammarinese politician
- Daniele Cardelli (born 1995), Italian football player
- Francesco Cardelli (born 1964), Sammarinese alpine skier
- Luca Cardelli, Italian computer scientist
- Marino Cardelli (born 1987), Sammarinese alpine skier

== See also ==
- Cardella
