= Metropolitan Regional Information Systems =

Multiple listing service

Metropolitan Regional Information Systems, Inc. (known as MRIS) provides a multiple listing service in the United States. As of mid-July 2010, it served 51,171 real estate professionals in Baltimore-Washington Metropolitan Area including Maryland, Washington DC, Northern Virginia, and parts of West Virginia and Pennsylvania.

Currently this is the largest MLS in North America, and it has evolved from a county-based system controlled by individual Associations of Realtors operating as members of and under the rules of the National Association of Realtors. By the early 1990s it became apparent that a sophisticated computer-based system was necessary to integrate the MLS systems of the many counties and jurisdictions in the tri-state areas (or, at least, tri-jurisdictions) of Maryland, Washington, DC and Virginia, most of which were in close proximity to the capital.

Originally, many county Associations offered dumb-terminal access to the MLS only in brokers' offices at speeds such as 300 baud and, eventually by the late 1980s, at 1,200 baud. After being founded in 1992, MRIS operated as a computer-based program on the Windows 3.1 operating system, with proprietary software issued by MRIS. (This was not unlike the plethora of internet access companies, each with its own software, which emerged at that time). Since updates required a new software release via floppy disc to be installed by all subscribers, changes came slowly.

It was only when MRIS decided to become an internet-based system with access available to all brokers/agents via the internet from any computer anywhere, that the present system was created.

== Database systems offered by MRIS ==
MRIS operates two parallel systems available only to licensed brokers, agents, and others (such as appraisers): "MATRIX" which is the database of property listings in all classes (including residential to raw land and lots) and categories from "Active" through "Sold" going back over more than ten years; and "KEYSTONE" the data entry site for agents to input new listings and update them.

On a daily basis, portions of the data from the full MRIS database of real estate listings is uploaded to public-access websites such as Realtor.com (with over 1 million listings nationwide) or to MRIS' own public-access site, http://homesdatabase.com, with the majority of the organization's members Washington DC area properties.

== Member organizations ==
Originally, brokers and agents doing business in different jurisdictions would have been required to obtain membership in several different MLS systems. When joining an individual Association of Realtors and becoming affiliated with NAR at the same time, individual brokers and agents have the option of joining MRIS. However, it would be difficult to conduct business without having access to the MLS system.

== Legal ==
In 2012, The MRIS was hit with an antitrust lawsuit by the American Home Realty Network, alleging that MRIS and NorthStar MLS were concerting an anti-competitive group boycott of American Home Realty Network. The lawsuit alleged that MRIS's lawsuit against American Home Realty Network and Northstar MLS's lawsuit against American Home Realty Network in Minnesota were attempts to drive American Home Realty Network out of business and eliminate it as a competitor in the market for real estate broker services. Through the antitrust lawsuit the American Home Realty Network was seeking damages and injunctive relief to bar MRIS and Northstar MLS from further predatory conduct and to "prevent harm to consumers in the market for residential real estate brokerage services."

== See also ==
- Metropolitan Regional Information System, Inc. v. American Home Realty Network, Inc.
- National Association of Realtors's for policies on MLS systems
- Multiple Listing Service for details on other MLS systems
- Flat fee MLS for an alternative new MLS system
- Real estate trends for the importance of MLS in the future
