= Yugorsk =

Yugorsk Югорск
- Town
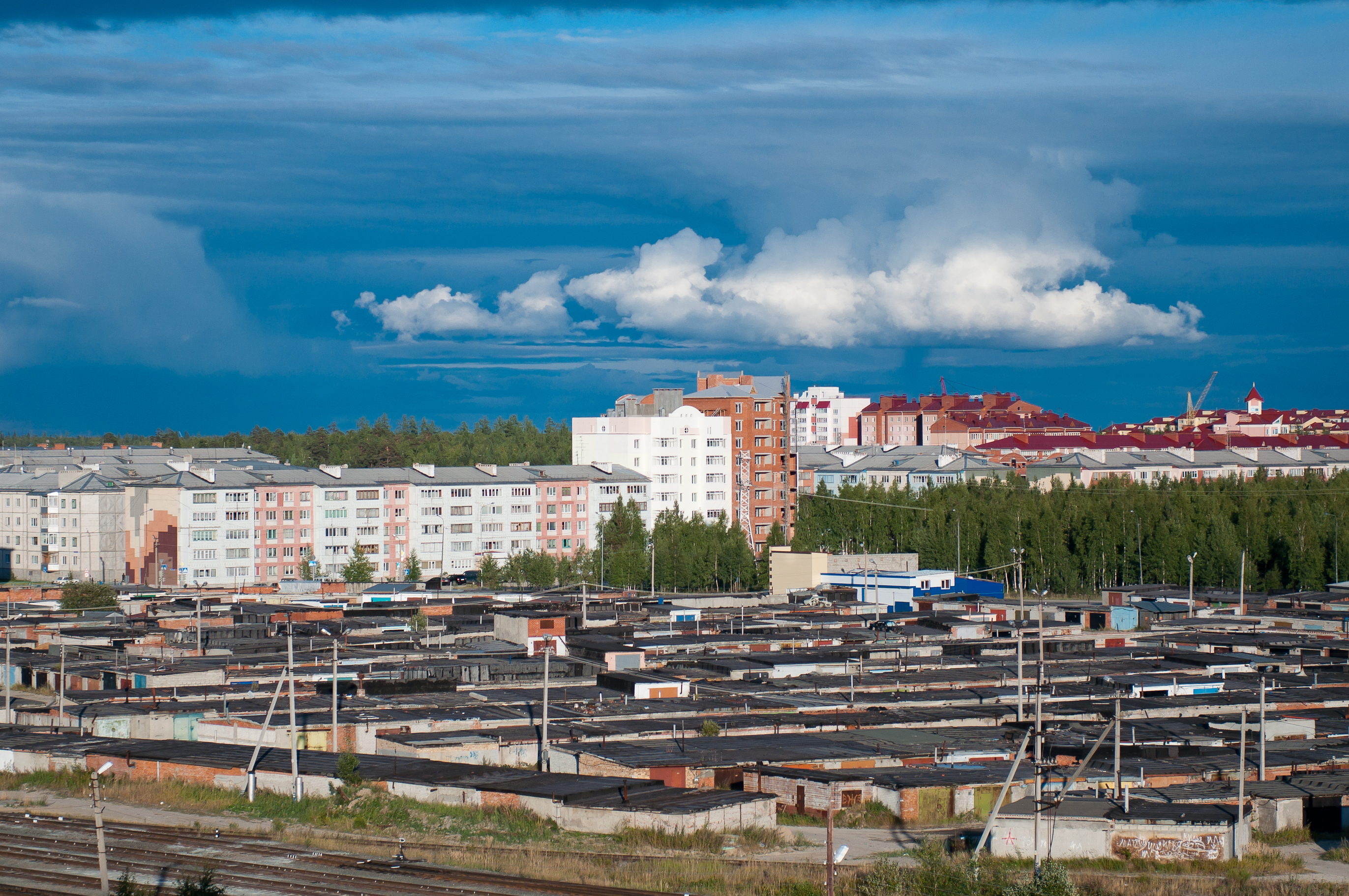

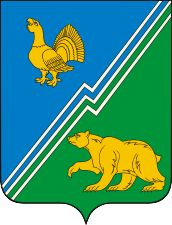
- Flag Coat of arms
- Interactive map of Yugorsk
- Location of Yugorsk Yugorsk (Khanty–Mansi Autonomous Okrug)
- Coordinates: 61°19′N 63°20′E
- Country: Russia
- Federal subject: Khanty-Mansi Autonomous Okrug
- Founded: 1962
- Elevation: 110 m (360 ft)

Population (2010 Census)
  - Total: 34,067
  - Estimate (2021): 38,238 (+12.2%)

Administrative status
  - Subordinated to: town of okrug significance of Yugorsk
  - Capital of: town of okrug significance of Yugorsk

Municipal status
  - Urban okrug: Yugorsk Urban Okrug
  - Capital of: Yugorsk Urban Okrug
- Time zone: UTC+5 (MSK+2)
- Postal code: 628260
- Dialing code: +7 34675
- OKTMO ID: 71887000001
- Website: www.ugorsk.ru

Yugorsk (Russian: Югорск) is a town in Khanty–Mansi Autonomous Okrug, Russia, located in the northwestern part of the East-West lowland, 420 kilometers (260 mi) from Khanty-Mansiysk. Population: 34,067 (2010 census); 30,285 (2002 census); 24,928 (1989 Soviet census).

== Geography ==
The relief in the town is flat. The town is surrounded by forests. The Ess River flows 5 kilometers (3.1 mi) from the town.

== History ==
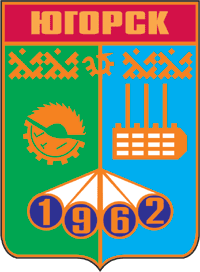
Historical coat of arms of Yugorsk

The settlement of Komsomolsky was built in 1962 to support timber and natural gas industries. The settlement grew as the gas fields of Western Siberia were being explored, and the production association Tyumentransgas (since 2007 GazpromTransgazYugorsk) developed. In March 1959, subdivisions of railway troops started the construction of the "Ivdel-Ob" railway.

The town was renamed Yugorsk in July 1992. The name originates from the name of the land "Yugra", or "Yugoria"—the place where the Khanty and Mansi peoples live.

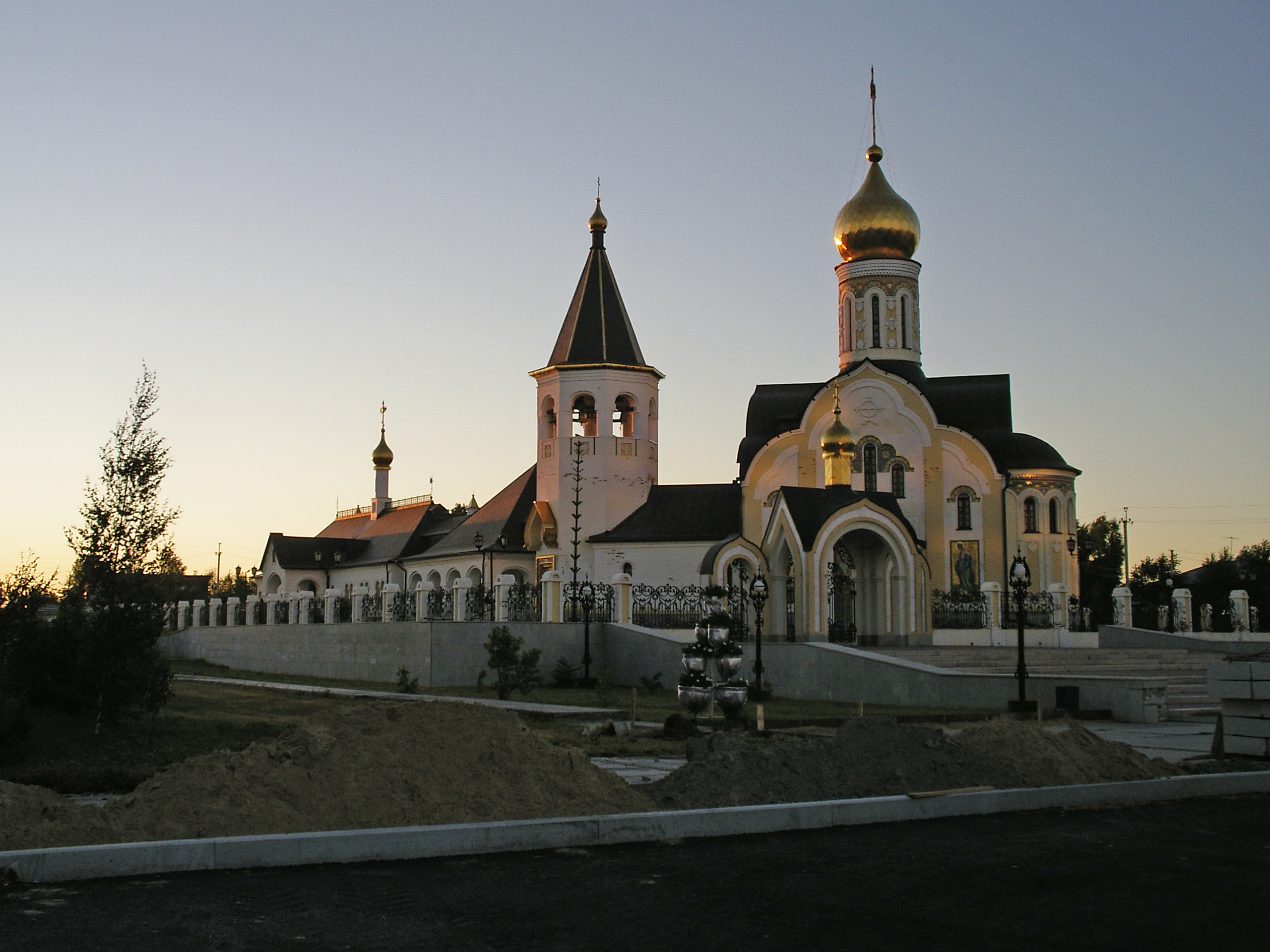
St. Sergius of Radonezh church in Yugorsk

== Administrative and municipal status ==
Within the framework of administrative divisions, it is incorporated as the town of okrug significance of Yugorsk—an administrative unit with the status equal to that of the districts. As a municipal division, the town of okrug significance of Yugorsk is incorporated as Yugorsk Urban Okrug.

== Employment ==
The OOO Gazprom transgaz Yugorsk gas company is based in Yugorsk.

== Notable people ==
- Denis Nevedrov, Russian born Armenian futsal player
