= Qaa (disambiguation) =

Qaa is a town in Baalbek-Hermel Governorate, Lebanon.

Qaa or QAA may also refer to:

- Qa'a, the last king of the First Dynasty of Egypt
- Qa'a (room), a guest room in Islamic architecture
- Quality Assurance Agency for Higher Education in the UK
- The QAA Podcast, formerly QAnon Anonymous, a podcast which researches and debunks conspiracy theories

== See also ==
- Q&A (disambiguation)
- Qa (Cyrillic), a letter
- Al-Qaa airstrike, a 2006 Israeli airstrike on Lebanon
- Qâa er Rîm, a populated place in the Beqaa Governorate of Lebanon
