= Jelly (app) =

Search-engine app acquired by Pinterest

- Website type: Subsidiary
- Founded: April 2013; 13 years ago
- Dissolved: April 2017
- Headquarters: San Francisco, United States
- Founders: Biz Stone; Ben Finkel
- Industry: Mobile apps
- Parent: Pinterest

Jelly was a Q&A platform app which was created by Jelly Industries, a search-engine company founded and led by Biz Stone, one of Twitter's co-founders. In March 2017, Jelly was acquired by Pinterest for an undisclosed amount.

Jelly differentiated itself from other Q&A platforms such as Quora and ChaCha by relying on visual imagery to steer people to getting better answers from within and outside their social networks. In particular, it encouraged people to use photos to ask questions.

== History ==
AllThingsD reported on March 28, 2013, that, according to sources, Twitter co-founder Biz Stone was close to launching a native mobile app called Jelly. On April 1, 2013, Stone wrote the company's first blog post, giving only vague information about the product. A TechCrunch writer inferred that the product would be targeted at do-gooders on the go. Other news publications also published speculation about the app.

In May 2013, while still in stealth mode, Jelly raised Series A funding from Spark Capital, SV Angel, Square CEO Jack Dorsey, Reid Hoffman, Al Gore, Bono, and others.

The app release was announced, thereby bringing Jelly out of stealth mode, on January 7, 2014. The announcement was picked up by much of the technology press and mainstream press. Stone explained to TechCrunch that the primary goal of Jelly was not to help people asking questions but to improve empathy among people answering questions by making them feel helpful to people around them. In an interview with Bloomberg News, Stone said that he never intended to create a company with Jelly, and that it was largely accidental.

The app was reviewed by Rachel Metz for Technology Review. The Next Web published advice for how brands could use the new app effectively.

On January 23, 2014, Jelly announced that it had raised Series B funding from Greylock Partners.

On March 31, 2014, Jelly updated its iOS app to the 1.1 version that allows users create questions using a map and a specific location.

On March 8, 2017, Pinterest said it had acquired Jelly Industries.

== See also ==
- Yahoo! Answers
