= Transweb =

Online tutoring and educational website

Coordinates: 42°43′20.13″N 73°48′2.44″W

Transweb Educational Services
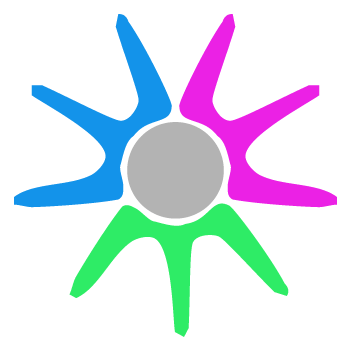
- Type: Private
- Industry: Internet, e-learning
- Founded: Delhi, India in April 2007
- Headquarters: Albany, United States
- Key people: Aditya Singhal (Co-founder), Nishant Sinha (Co-founder)
- Products: Online tutoring, Homework Assistance

Transweb Educational Services, founded in 2007 by Aditya Singhal and Nishant Sinha, is an online tutoring and educational website. The website provides educational resources to students from grade 4 to university level, through its five websites.

== Overview ==
Transweb comprises five websites: askIITians, eMedicalPrep, Transtutors, Transwebtutors and Mycollegeabroad.

- askIITians caters primarily to students in India and the Middle East when preparing for engineering entrance exams like the IIT-JEE or AIEEE.
- eMedicalPrep cater to medical students taking entrance exams such as the AIPMT or AIIMS.
- Transtutors is a question-and-answer format website for homework help.
- Transwebtutors offers paid online tutoring in mostly technical subjects.
- Mycollegeabroad is for students living abroad that needing college admission consulting.

A number of these websites provide services such as virtual classrooms, with text chat, audio chat and shared whiteboards.

== Rajiv Gandhi Navodaya, Dehradun ==
AskIITians is in collaboration with the Rajiv Gandhi Navodaya school in Dehradun, Uttarakhand to provide "three-month free coaching for preparing engineering and medical examinations" to students, utilising an "online base [with] live, interactive classrooms by the institute." Rural students of RGNV get free education, boarding and lodging facility and around 150 students get online assistance in evening after the school is over.
