= Knowledge policy =

Institutional foundations for creating, managing, and using organizational knowledge

Knowledge policies provide institutional foundations for creating, managing, and using organizational knowledge as well as social foundations for balancing global competitiveness with social order and cultural values. Knowledge policies can be viewed from a number of perspectives: the necessary linkage to technological evolution, relative rates of technological and institutional change, as a control or regulatory process, obstacles posed by cyberspace, and as an organizational policy instrument.

Policies are the paradigms of government and all bureaucracies. Policies provide a context of rules and methods to guide how large organizations meet their responsibilities. Organizational knowledge policies describe the institutional aspects of knowledge creation, management, and use within the context of an organization's mandate or business model. Social knowledge policies balance between progress in the knowledge economy to promote global competitiveness with social values, such as equity, unity, and the well-being of citizens.

== History ==
From a technological perspective, Thomas Jefferson (1816) noted that laws and institutions must keep pace with the progress of the human mind. Institutions must advance as new discoveries are made, new truths are discovered, and as opinions and circumstances change. Fast-forwarding to the late 20th century, Martin (1985) stated that any society with a high level of automation must frame its laws and safeguards so that computers can police other computers. Tim Berners-Lee (2000) noted that both policy and technology must be designed with an understanding of the implications of each other. Finally, Sparr (2001) points out that rules will emerge in cyberspace because even on the frontier, pioneers need property rights, standards, and rules of fair play to protect them from pirates. Government is the only entity that can enforce such rules, but they could be developed by others.

From a rate of change point of view, McGee and Prusak (1993) note that when an organization changes its culture, information policies are among the last thing to change. From a market perspective, Martin (1996) points out that although cyberspace mechanisms change very rapidly, laws change very slowly, and that some businesses will use this gap for competitive advantage. Similarly, Sparr (2001) discerned that governments have the interest and means to govern new areas of technology, but that past laws generally do not yet cover these emerging technologies and new laws take time to create.

A number of authors have indicated that it will be very difficult to monitor and regulate cyberspace. Negroponte (1997) uses a metaphor of limiting the freedom of bit radiation is like the Romans attempting to stop Christianity, even though early data broadcasters may be eaten by Washington lions. Brown (1997) questions whether it will even be possible for governments to monitor compliance with regulations in the face of exponentially increasing encrypted traffic within private networks. As cybernetic environments become central to commercial activity, monitoring electronic markets will become increasingly problematic. From a corporate point of view, Flynn (1956) notes that employee use of corporate computer resources poses liability risks and jeopardizes security and that no organization can afford to engage in electronic communications and e-commerce unprepared.

A key attribute of cyberspace is that it is a virtual rather than a real place. Thus, a growing share of social and commercial electronic activity does not have a national physical location (Cozel (1997)), raising a key question of whether legislatures can even set national policies or coordinate international policies. Similarly, Berners-Lee (2000) explains that key criterion of Trademark law – separation in location or market – does not work for World-Wide Web domain names because the Internet crosses all geographic boundaries and has no concept of a market area.

From an organizational perspective, Simard (2000) states that "if traditional policies are applied directly [to a digital environment], the Canadian Forest Service could become marginalized in a dynamic knowledge-based economy." Consequently, the CFS developed and implemented an Access to Knowledge Policy that "fosters the migration of the CFS towards providing free, open access to its knowledge assets, while recognizing the need for cost recovery and the need to impose restrictions on access in some cases" (Simard, 2005). The policy comprises a framework of objectives, guiding principles, staff responsibilities, and policy directives. The directives include ownership and use; roles, rights, and responsibilities; levels of access and accessibility; service to clients; and cost of access.

== See also ==
- Cybernetics – Transdisciplinary field concerned with regulatory and purposive systems
- Cyberspace – Concept describing a widespread, interconnected digital technology
- Digital economy – Economy based on digital computing technologies
- Electronic business – Business that takes place over the internet
- Electronic commerce – Type of business industry usually conducted over the internet
- E-government
- Information market
- Information society – Society driven by the processing and communication of information
- Internet economy – Economy based on digital computing technologies
- Knowledge economy – Approach to generating value
- Knowledge management – Processing of knowledge to accomplish organizational goals
- Knowledge market – Mechanism for distributing knowledge resources
- Knowledge organization – Field of study related to Library and Information Science
- Viable system model – Theoretical framework of management cybernetics
