= Gutefrage.net =

German question and answer website

gutefrage.net
- Website type: Advice community
- Available in: German
- Owners: Markus Wölflick, Dr. Stephan Roppel
- Website: www.gutefrage.net
- Commercial: Yes
- Registration: Required for participation
- Users: c. 4.5 million (daily, as of February 2021)
- Launched: 2006; 20 years ago
- Current status: Active

gutefrage (from German gute Frage, which means "good question") is a German question and answer website without topic specialization.

The website is financed by advertisement, but it is possible to pay to use the site without advertisements. The user-generated content is freely available to platform users and cannot necessarily be changed or deleted by content creators at will. Content is only allowed in German, with the exception of quotes, meanings, or specific translations.

== History ==
In 2006, gutefrage.net went online as the first self-initiated startup by Holtzbrinck eLAB, a subsidiary of the Holtzbrinck Publishing Group. The website has developed into the most-used product of the Gutefrage Group and, regarding its content growth and page views, has become one of the largest forums in the German-speaking world. According to its own reports, the company crossed their profit threshold in 2009.

Towards the end of 2012, a mobile version of the website went online; applications for Android and iOS followed in December 2013.

On December 7, 2016, the logo for gutefrage.net was renewed in honor of the site's tenth birthday. The new logo shows two speech bubbles; the smaller bubble on the left is intended to represent a question, whereas the larger bubble on the right is intended to represent an answer. In conjunction with this change, the added ".net" was removed from the logo.

In June 2020, gutefrage.net entered into a collaboration with Amazon, whereby the virtual assistant Alexa is able to access selected posts from the platform and play back answers to user questions.

In 2020, the majority share of gutefrage.net was purchased by United Vertical Media GmbH, an affiliate of Müller Medien. As of February 2021, the website contains over 24 million questions with more than 94 million answers.

== Concept ==
The internet forum allows users to ask and answer questions of other users.

The site is composed primarily of user-generated content. User posts are rewarded with an internal gamification system which is based on ratings given by other users. Users with a significant level of engagement within a given topic are, after individual verification by gutefrage.net employees, distinguished as "experts."

Aside from asking and answering questions, users can communicate with each other via private messages. Askers have the option to select the most helpful answers to each of their questions; the selected answer is then visibly accentuated.

== Facts and data ==
As of 2021, the platform reported around 1.85 million active users, 27 million questions, and over 100 million answers. The website's monthly net reach accounted for 30 million unique users. A given question can expect to receive an average of four answers, with 72% of questions being answered within the first five minutes. Users post a monthly average of 255,000 questions on gutefrage.net.
