= Fixya =

- Company type: Private
- Available in: English
- Headquarters: San Mateo, California
- Area served: Worldwide
- Founder: Yaniv Bensadon
- Website: fixya.com
- Launched: June 2005
- Current status: Active

Fixya is a question-and-answer website where community members ask and answer questions about consumer products. The company was launched in June 2005. The founder is Yaniv Bensadon.

Fixya's main competitors are similar websites such as Quora, Ask.com, Answers.com, and numerous question and answer websites.

Fixya released a mobile app in 2012 for users to ask and answer questions via video from their mobile device. The app was nominated for a 2013 Webby Award in the category of "Best Use of Device Camera".
