= Uclue =

Uclue was an online fee-based research service that operated between February 28, 2007 and December 15 2017.

At one time, Uclue employed researchers in North America, South America, Europe, Australia, Japan, and the Philippines. Uclue was able to provide research and translation in English, German, Spanish, Tagalog, and conversational French.

Over 1,000 people from six continents registered on Uclue as both clients and commentators. Commentators, who were not researchers, contributed by posting helpful comments on questions and answers. As of May 2014, more than 6,000 questions had been posted on Uclue.

== Services ==
Uclue provided answers to questions on Business, Genealogy, all the Sciences, Technology, Computer/Software Help, Health, and the Arts. Questions range from high-level business research: "Research on the NGO sector," to locating equipment and other items: "Color NTSC video camera for low-light usage," to the quirky: "How to Amuse a cat."

The fee range was $10 to $400, with customers selecting the fee based on the complexity and/or obscurity of the requested information. Customers were encouraged to use the lower end of the fee scale only for relatively simple questions. Customers also had the option of tipping researchers.

== Origins ==
Uclue's started after Google closed their Google Answers service to new questions on November 30, 2006. Tomi Poutanen, Yahoo's Product Manager for Social Search, set up a group discussion with former Google Answers Researchers (GARs) to set up a similar service at Yahoo, but discussions soon fizzled.

Computer programmer and former GAR Roger Browne (known as eiffel-ga at Google Answers) announced he was starting a new Q&A service, Uclue. Startup of Uclue in Beta began on February 28, 2007, and the launch was publicly announced on March 7, 2007. Browne explained, "We were all saddened at the demise of GA, but we know there is a terrific need for a place where users can get fast, professional, high-quality research at a surprisingly low cost. Uclue is that place, and we're thrilled to announce that we're now in business". As of May 2007, 37 former GARs had joined Uclue.

In Computerworld's March 8, 2007 feature article on Uclue, Emily Moore (Uclue researcher "journalist") expanded on Uclue's mission, which is "to assist people who don't have the time to search for themselves, or don't know how to search, [or] how to get into the deep Web. . .The niche that Uclue fills is for quality detailed, comprehensive information. People are quite willing to pay for that."

== Comparison of Uclue to Google Answers ==
Uclue explained the differences in response to a question from Philipp Lenssen of Google Blogoscoped. (Lenssen is a former GAR known as j_philipp-ga): Question: How does Uclue compare to Google Answers?

== Business model ==
Uclue founder Roger Browne explained Uclue's business model in his answer to the question "Uclue itself":

"The financial basis for the business is straightforward. The income comes from question fees and tips. A few percent are lost due to payment processing costs. Of the remainder, 100% of tips and 75% of question fees goes to the researchers, and 25% of question fees goes to the service where it pays for hosting, software development, software maintenance, administration, marketing, legal expenses, etc. ... Apart from software development, the other costs are roughly proportional to question volume. Therefore, in the long term, once the software development costs are amortized, the business is financially sustainable at any size - large or small."
