= Yahoo Answers =

Online question and answer forum owned by Yahoo!

Yahoo! Answers
- Website type: Collaboration
- Available in: English; Chinese; French; German; Indonesian; Italian; Japanese; Korean; Portuguese; Spanish; Thai; Vietnamese
- Founded: December 8, 2005; 20 years ago
- Dissolved: May 4, 2021; 5 years ago for all languages except Japanese.
- Website: web.archive.org/web/20210415003832/https://answers.yahoo.com/
- Commercial: No
- Launched: December 8, 2005; 20 years ago
- Current status: Offline

Yahoo! Answers was a community-driven question-and-answer (Q&A) website or knowledge market owned by Yahoo! where users would ask questions and answer those submitted by others, and upvote them to increase their visibility. Questions were organised into categories with multiple sub-categories under each to cover every topic users may ask questions on. The number of poorly formed questions and inaccurate answers made the site a target of ridicule.

On April 5, 2021, Yahoo! announced that Yahoo! Answers would be shutting down. On April 20, 2021, the website switched to read-only and users were no longer able to ask or answer questions. The site ceased operations on May 4, 2021. The URL now redirects to the Yahoo! homepage. An unaffiliated Japanese version remains online.

== History ==
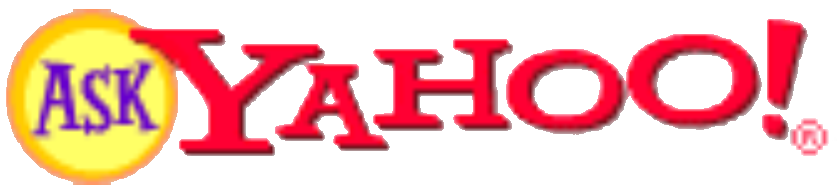
Logo of the Ask Yahoo! service at the time of its discontinuation in favour of Yahoo! Answers

The website Yahoo! was officially incorporated on March 2, 1995, and was created by Jerry Yang and David Filo. The website began as a search directory for various websites, and soon grew into an established Internet resource that featured the "Yahoo! Answers" platform. Yahoo! Answers was launched in mid-2005 for internal alpha testing by Director of Engineering Ofer Shaked. The beta version Yahoo! Answers was launched to the general public on December 8, 2005 and was available until May 14, 2006. Yahoo! Answers was finally made available for general availability on May 15, 2006. Yahoo! Answers was created to replace Ask Yahoo!, Yahoo!'s former Q&A platform which was discontinued in March 2006. The site gave members the chance to earn points as a way to encourage participation and was based on Naver's Knowledge iN.

Yahoo! Answers was available in 12 languages, with several Asian language versions operating a different platform which allows for non-Latin characters. An Arabic language Q&A platform called Seen Jeem was available through the Yahoo! subsidiary Maktoob until 2010, and the Chinese language version Yahoo! Knowledge was available until 2021. The platform is known as Yahoo! Chiebukuro (Yahoo!知恵袋) in Japan.

On December 8, 2016, Yahoo! released an app for the platform called Yahoo! Answers Now (formally known as Yahoo! Hive) for iOS and Android.

=== Closure ===
On April 5, 2021, an announcement was made that Yahoo! Answers would be shutting down on May 4, 2021, with questions and answers no longer being postable after April 20, 2021, and questions and answers stored on the site being deleted after June 30, 2021. On May 4, 2021, the site ceased operations and redirected to a Yahoo Help page (Note: Most content may remain available through the digital archive the Wayback Machine.) until July, after which it redirected to the main Yahoo page. Yahoo gave reduced usage of the site as the reason for shutting down, saying "it has become less popular over the years." The archivist group Archive Team and others worked to archive the site to preserve in the Internet Archive. The group was able to archive 4.75 TB of data during the "read only" period, but not the full site. The same day the site shut down, the wider Yahoo brand was sold to Apollo Global Management.

The closure did not affect the Yahoo! Japan version of the site, Yahoo! Chiebukuro (Yahoo!知恵袋) which remains online.

== Site operation ==
Yahoo! Answers allowed any questions that did not violate Yahoo! Answers community guidelines. To encourage good answers, helpful participants were occasionally featured on the Yahoo! Answers Blog. Though the service itself was free, the contents of the answers were owned by the respective users; Yahoo! maintains a non-exclusive and royalty-free worldwide right to publish the information. Chat was explicitly forbidden in the Community Guidelines, although categories like Politics and Religion & Spirituality were mostly opinion. Users could also choose to reveal their Yahoo! Messenger ID on their Answers profile page.

Misuse of Yahoo! Answers was handled by a user moderation system, where users reported posts that were in breach of guidelines or the Terms of Service. Posts were removed if they received a sufficient weight of trusted reports (reports from users that had a reliable reporting history). Deletion could be appealed: an unsuccessful appeal received a 10-point penalty; a successful one reinstated the post and reduced the 'trust rating' (reporting power) of the reporter(s). If a user received a large number of violations in a relatively short amount of time or a very serious violation, it could cause the abuser's account to be suspended. In extreme (but rare) cases (for a Terms of Service violation), the abuser's entire Yahoo! ID could be suddenly deactivated without warning.

To open an account, a user needed a Yahoo! ID but could use any name as identification on Yahoo! Answers. A user could be represented by a picture from various internet avatar sites or a user-made graphic uploaded to replace their default Yahoo graphic. Yahoo! Avatars was discontinued in 2012. When answering a question, a user could search Yahoo! or Wikipedia, or any source the user wished, as long as they mentioned their source.

Questions were initially open to answers for four days, and the question's asker could choose to pick a best answer for the question after a minimum of one hour. However, comments and answers could still be posted after this time. To ask a question, one had to have a Yahoo! account with a positive score balance of five points or more.

The points system was weighted to encourage users to answer questions and to limit spam questions. There were also levels (with point thresholds), which gave more site access. Points and levels had no real world value, could not be traded, and served only to indicate how active a user had been on the site. A notable downside to the points/level system was that it encouraged people to answer questions even when they did not have a suitable answer to give to gain points. Users also received ten points for contributing the "Best Answer" which was selected by the question's asker. The voting function, which allowed users to vote for the answer they considered best, was discontinued in April 2014.

In addition to points awarded for activity, Yahoo! Answers staff could also have awarded extra points if they were impressed with a user's contributions. The Yahoo! Answers community manager has said "power users" who defend the company should be thanked and rewarded.

== Level table ==
	Level 1	Level 2	Level 3	Level 4	Level 5	Level 6	Level 7
Points	1–249	250–999	1,000–2,499	2,500–4,999	5,000–9,999	10,000–24,999	25,000+
Questions	5	10	15	20			
Answers	20	80	120	160			
Commentaries	10	20	30	40			
Stars	10	100					
Evaluation permission	No	Yes					

Note: All limitations were per day.

Users began on level 1 and received 100 free points. Prior to this, they began on level 0, could answer only one question, and then were promoted to level 1.

Before April 20, 2012, users levels 5 and above could give an unlimited number of questions, answers, and comments. Yahoo! Answers established an upper limit to curb spam and unproductive answers. Before April 2014, users were also able to vote for a best answer if the asker did not choose one, but this was discontinued.

== Badges ==
=== Top Contributor ===
The point system ostensibly encouraged users to answer as many questions as they possibly could, up to their daily limit. Once a user achieved and maintained a certain minimum number of such contributions (See Note*, further ...), they could receive an orange "badge" under the name of their avatar, naming the user a Top Contributor (TC). Users could lose this badge if they did not maintain their level of participation. Once a user became a "Top Contributor" in any category, the badge appeared in all answers, questions, and comments by the user, regardless of category. A user could be a Top Contributor in a maximum of three categories. The list of Top contributors was updated every Monday. Although Yahoo! Answers staff kept secret the conditions of becoming a TC, many theories existed among users, for example:

- Maintaining a weekly (mystery) "quota" of answers in the category.
- User wanting to become a TC had to have more than or equal to 12% Best answers.
- User should be at least on level 2, although there were claims that first-level users with TC Badge had been seen.
- User should concentrate on only one particular category to become a Top Contributor for that category.

Out of these, none had an official status. This feature began on March 8, 2007.

=== Staff ===
This badge was seen under the names of staff members of Yahoo! Answers.

=== Official ===
This type of badge was found on the name of celebrities (like mentioned above) and government departments like the health department.

=== Knowledge Partners ===
These badges were found under the name of the companies or organizations who share their personal knowledge and experience with the members of Yahoo! Answers.

== Academic studies ==
A number of studies have looked at the structure of the community and the interaction between askers and responders. Studies of user typology on the site revealed that some users ("specialists") answered from personal knowledge while others ("synthesists") used external sources to construct answers – synthesists tending to accumulate more reward points. Adamic et al. looked at the ego networks of users and showed that it was possible to distinguish "answer people" from "discussion people" with the former found in specialist categories for factual information, such as mathematics and the latter more common in general interest categories, such as marriage and wrestling. They also showed that answer length was a good predictor of "best answer" choice. Kim and Oh looked at the comments given by users on choosing best answers and showed that content completeness, solution feasibility and personal agreement/confirmation were the most significant criteria.

== Quality of answers ==
Researchers found that questions seeking factual information received few answers and that the knowledge on Yahoo! Answers was generally broad but quite superficial.

"Internet language" including incorrect spelling and improper grammar also contributed to Yahoo! Answers' reputation of being a source of entertainment rather than a fact-based question and answer platform, and for the reliability, validity, and relevance of its answers. A 2008 study found that Yahoo! Answers was "not optimal" for questions requiring factual answers and that the quality decreased as the number of users increased. One journalist observed that the structure of Yahoo! Answers, particularly the persistence of inaccuracies, the inability to correct those inaccuracies, and a point structure that rewards participation more than accuracy, all indicated that the site was oriented towards encouraging use of the site and not towards offering accurate answers to questions. The number of poorly formed questions and inaccurate answers made the site a target of ridicule. Likewise, posts on many Internet forums and Yahoo! Answers itself indicated that Yahoo! Answers attracted a large number of trolls.

The site did not have a system that filtered the correct answers from the incorrect answers. At one time, the community could vote for the best answer among the posted answers; but that option was disabled in March 2014. For most of the life of Yahoo! Answers, once the "best answer" was chosen, there was no way to add more answers nor to improve or challenge the best answer chosen by the question asker; there was a display of thumbs down or thumbs up for each answer, but viewers could not vote. In April 2014, this was changed to allow for additional answers after a best answer was chosen, but the best answer could never be changed. Also, while "best answers" could be briefly commented upon, the comment was not visible by default and was hence hardly read. Even the user who posts the question wasn't notified, before or after the best answer was picked, about a comment on the question or on the best answer. If the best answer chosen was wrong or contained problematic information, the only chance to give a better (or correct) answer would be the next time the same question was asked.

== Promotions and events ==
=== Yamster ===
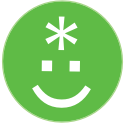
The Yahoo! Answers green smiley

The official Yahoo! Answers mascot was a cartoon hamster called Yamster. The name Yamster was a combination, or portmanteau, of the words "Yahoo" and "hamster". The mascot was also used as an avatar for Yahoo! Answers staff.

During beta testing of Yahoo! Answers in 2005, the Director of Product Management would use a Gemmy Kung Fu Hamster to summon employees to meetings. The toy was a battery-operated, dancing, musical plush hamster clothed in a karate uniform. A Yahoo! Answers employee selected a photo of the toy as the staff avatar. A user then questioned the potential trademark/copyright infringement of using such an avatar. At that time, the photo was replaced with the Yahoo! Answers green smiley face. At the beginning of 2006, the green smiley face was replaced by the cartoon Yamster clad in a karate uniform. As of November 2009, the history of Yamster, complete with photos of the toy, was available on the Yahoo! Answers Team Vietnam blog.

=== Special guests ===
Several celebrities and notables appeared on Yahoo! Answers to ask questions. These users had an "official" badge below their avatar and on their profile page. During the 2008 U.S. presidential campaign, Hillary Clinton, John McCain, Barack Obama, and Mitt Romney posted questions on Yahoo! Answers, in addition to YouTube. In an awareness campaign, "UNICEF Up Close 2007", nine UNICEF ambassadors asked questions. The launch of Answers on Yahoo! India included a question from A. P. J. Abdul Kalam, the President of India at that time. Other guests included international leaders (Queen Rania of Jordan, candidate for United Nations Secretary-General Shashi Tharoor), Nobel Peace Prize laureates (Al Gore, Muhammad Yunus) and other international activists (Bono, Jean-Michel Cousteau), intellectuals (Stephen Hawking, Marilyn vos Savant), and numerous other celebrities.

== Site statistics ==
Yahoo! used comScore statistics in December 2006 to proclaim Yahoo! Answers "the leading Q&A site on the web". At one point Yahoo! Answers was ranked as the second most popular Q&A site on the web by comScore. The slogan "The world's leading Q&A site" has since been adopted by Answers.com.

In 2009, Yahoo! Answers staff claimed 200 million users worldwide and 15 million users visiting daily. Google Trends reported around four million unique visitors (Global) daily. In January 2010, the web analytics website Quantcast reported 24 million active users (US) per month; in November 2015, that had fallen by 77% to 5.6 million. Quantcast traffic statistics for Yahoo! Answers, January 2010:

- 24,201,619 people per month (US)
- 62,171,200 visits per month (US)

For January 1–30, 2015:

- 11,273,839 people per month (US)

For October 31 – November 29, 2015:

- 5,555,080 people per month (US)

For December 1 – December 30, 2015:

- 4,546,016 people per month (US)

Google Ad Planner traffic statistics for Yahoo! Answers, December 2009:

- 26,000,000 unique visitors (users) (US)
- 110,000,000 total visits (US)

Compete Site Analytics traffic statistics for Yahoo! Answers, December 2009:

- 33,090,163 unique visitors (US)
- 64,928,634 visits (US)

Yahoo! Answers represented between 1.03% to 1.7% of Yahoo! traffic.

== In popular media ==
The comedy/advice podcast My Brother, My Brother and Me featured a reoccurring segment in which co-host Griffin McElroy selected and read a particularly humorous or outrageous question from Yahoo! Answers, submitted by listeners of the podcast. The hosts would then discuss and attempt to answer the question, to comedic effect. The McElroys held a memorial for Yahoo Answers in the episode "Funeral for a Friend", shortly ahead of the service's closure.

The Internet troll Ken M was a regular user on Yahoo! Answers, posting comments that confounded and annoyed other users. There were several communities on social media sites such as Reddit and Facebook dedicated to observing his antics, especially on Yahoo! Answers. Ken was named as one of Time's most influential people online in 2016.

== See also ==
- Comparison of Q&A sites
- Answers.com
- Ask MetaFilter
- Askalo
- Askville
- Blurtit
- Google Answers
- Q&A software
- Hunch
- Knowledge Search
- LinkedIn Answers
- Quora
- Stack Exchange
