= Maurice Blik =

British sculptor

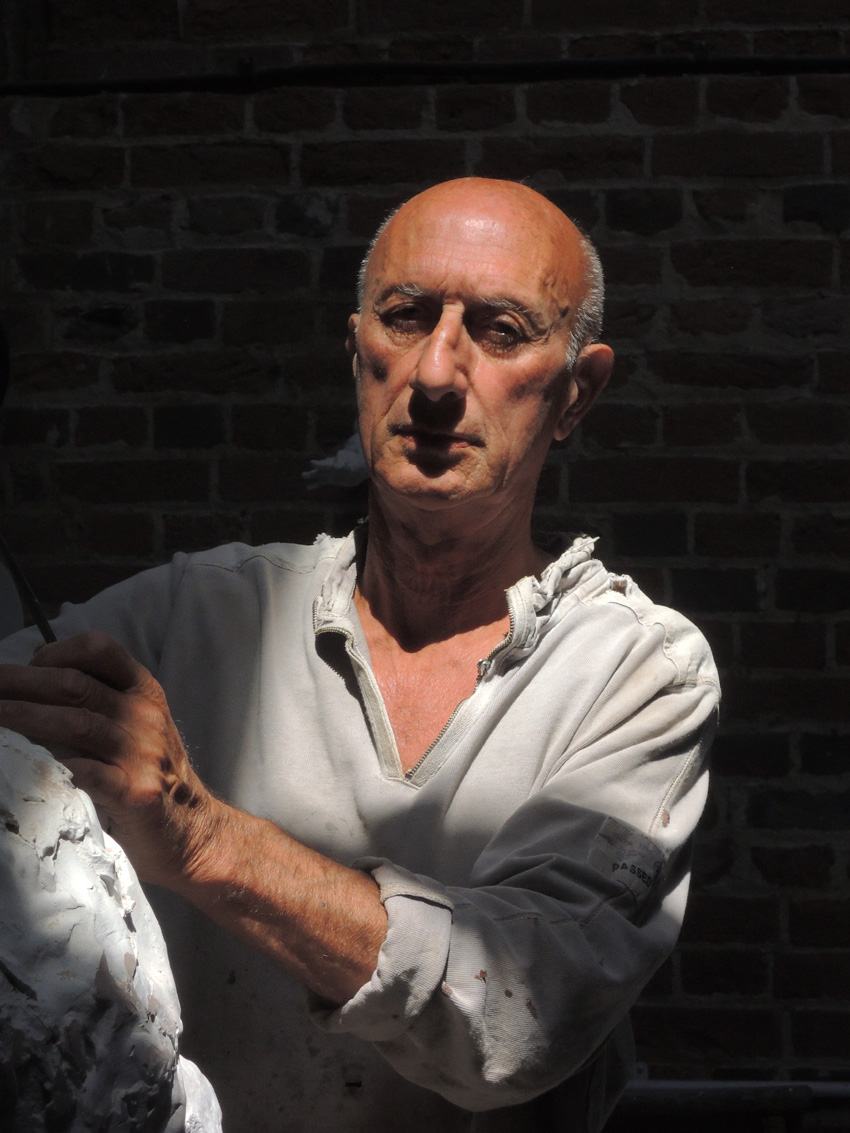
- Blik in 2017
- Born: 21 April 1939 (age 86); Amsterdam, Netherlands
- Education: Hornsey College of Art
- Alma mater: University of London
- Occupation: Sculptor

Maurice Blik, PPRBS (born 21 April 1939) is a British sculptor and past President of the Royal British Society of Sculptors. He is known for his figurative male sculpture.

== Early life ==
Born in Amsterdam, the Netherlands, much of his work is influenced by his experience of being interned in Belsen concentration camp as a young child. The story of his life and work was featured in The Times newspaper on 30 September 2005. In 1942, at the age of four, his family were deported to the Westerbork transit camp. From there, his father was moved to Auschwitz, while Blik, his sister, mother and grandmother were sent to Belsen. Belsen was not officially a death camp but many died from hunger and disease. The young Blik learnt quickly to spot people who had died in their barracks so as to take any food they had kept for themselves: "I wasn't aware that it was horrific to have to drag dead people out of their bunks." Belsen was liberated by British troops in April 1945, but Blik and his surviving family members had been loaded on to one of two trains that removed some of the internees to the east to Leipzig. After two weeks locked in on the train, he looked out the window and saw "Cossacks galloping on horseback towards us. That was it. Our liberation." He came to realise in later life after seeing video footage of Cossacks that the horses that feature strongly in his sculpture were the horse of his liberation. At the age of six, Blik, his sister and mother moved to England to join his aunt who already lived there.

For some forty years Blik did not come to terms with his childhood experience or confront the face of humanity he had witnessed. He began finding a voice through his series of horses' heads sculptures in the late 1980's.

== Career ==
Maurice Blik studied at Hornsey College of Art (National Diploma in Sculpture, 1960), followed by an Art Teacher’s Certificate, University of London (1969), and has enjoyed a successful career as a sculptor, both in the UK and the USA since his first one-man exhibition at Alwin Gallery, London (1985). Since 2008 he has been represented by Bowman Sculpture, London, through whom his work is exhibited at major international art fairs.

Noteworthy past exhibitions include: one-man exhibition at Alwin Gallery, London (1985); Royal Academy Summer Exhibition (1991, 1993, 1997, 1998); one-man exhibition at Blain’s Fine Art, London (1999); one-man exhibition at The Royal British Society of Sculptors, London (2008).

He was awarded resident status by the USA Government in 1992 under the category ‘person of extraordinary artistic ability’, and was elected President of the Royal British Society of Sculptors(1996-1997), and a Fellow of the Royal Society of Arts (1997).

== Film and television ==
Blik has been the subject of films and documentaries: ‘The Art of Remembering’ BBC, directed by Tim Robinson (1998); performance film ‘Second Breath’ directed by Gillian Lacey (2007), ‘Hollow Dog’(2017) and 'The Last Survivors' BBC, directed by Arthur Cary (2019)

== Sculpture works ==
Blik has a number of public sculptures in the UK and USA, including ‘Renaissance’, East India Docks, London (1995); ‘Behold’ Middlesex University, UK (2000); ’Splishsplash’, Vanderbilt University Medical Center, Nashville, USA (2005);‘Second Breath’, Chandler Hospital, University of Kentucky, USA (2011); ‘Every Which Way’, National Memorial Arboretum, Staffordshire, UK (2017).

When asked why lots of his sculptures have their arms raised to heavens, Blik replied "I don't go out consciously to illustrate events of my past - these things kind of emerge, I work with clay and I have a vague idea of what I want, but as I'm working it comes into being and people seem to find them aspirational and life affirming."

== Gallery ==
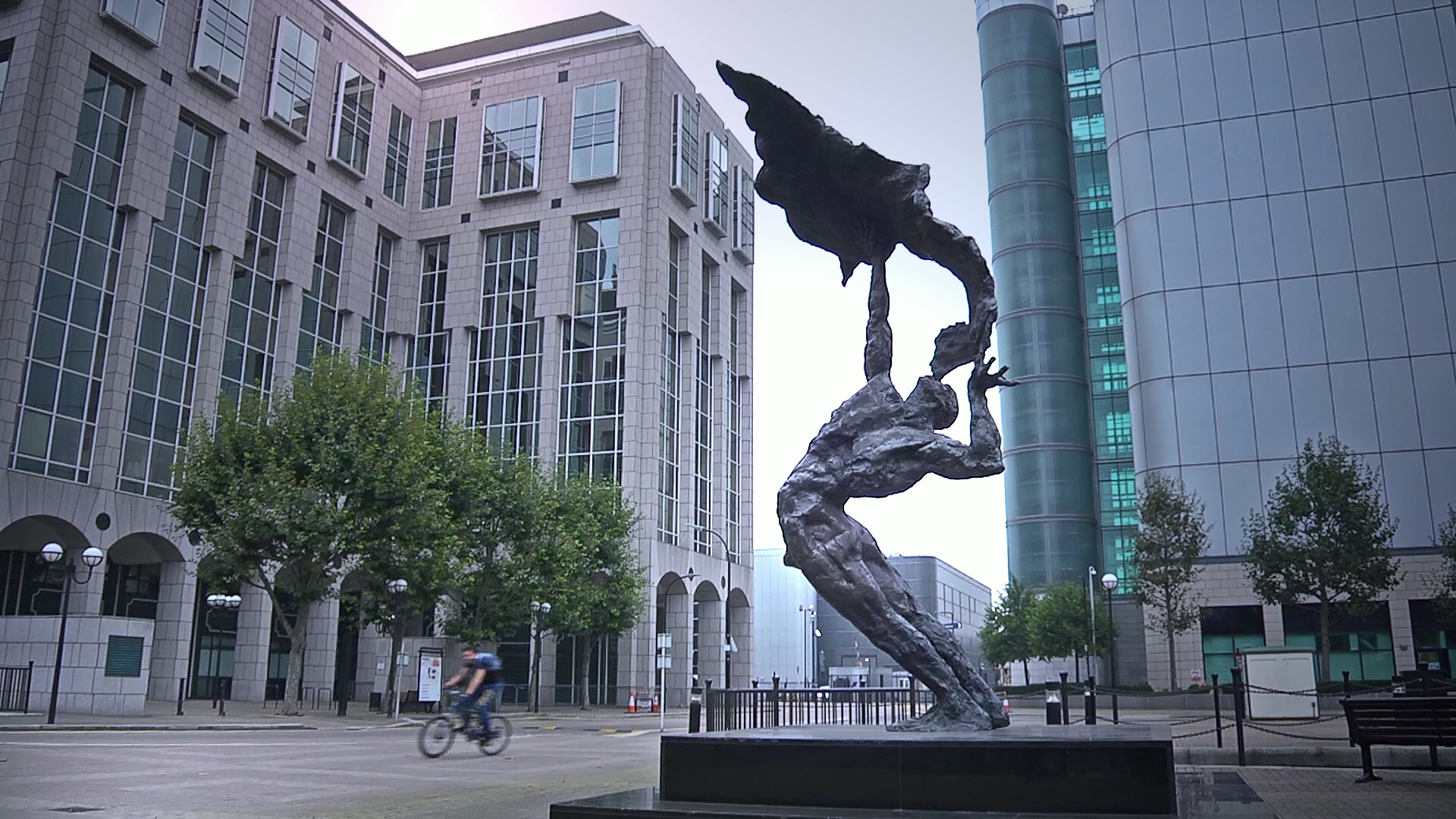
Renaissance

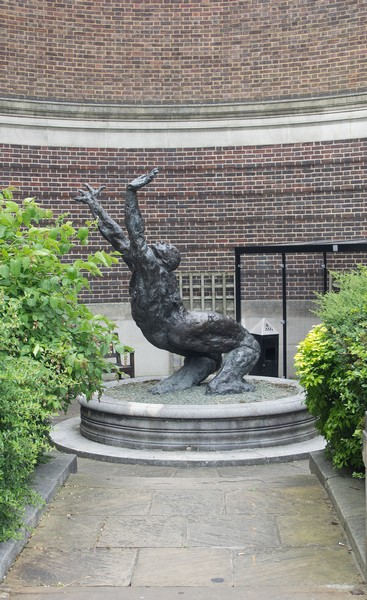
Behold

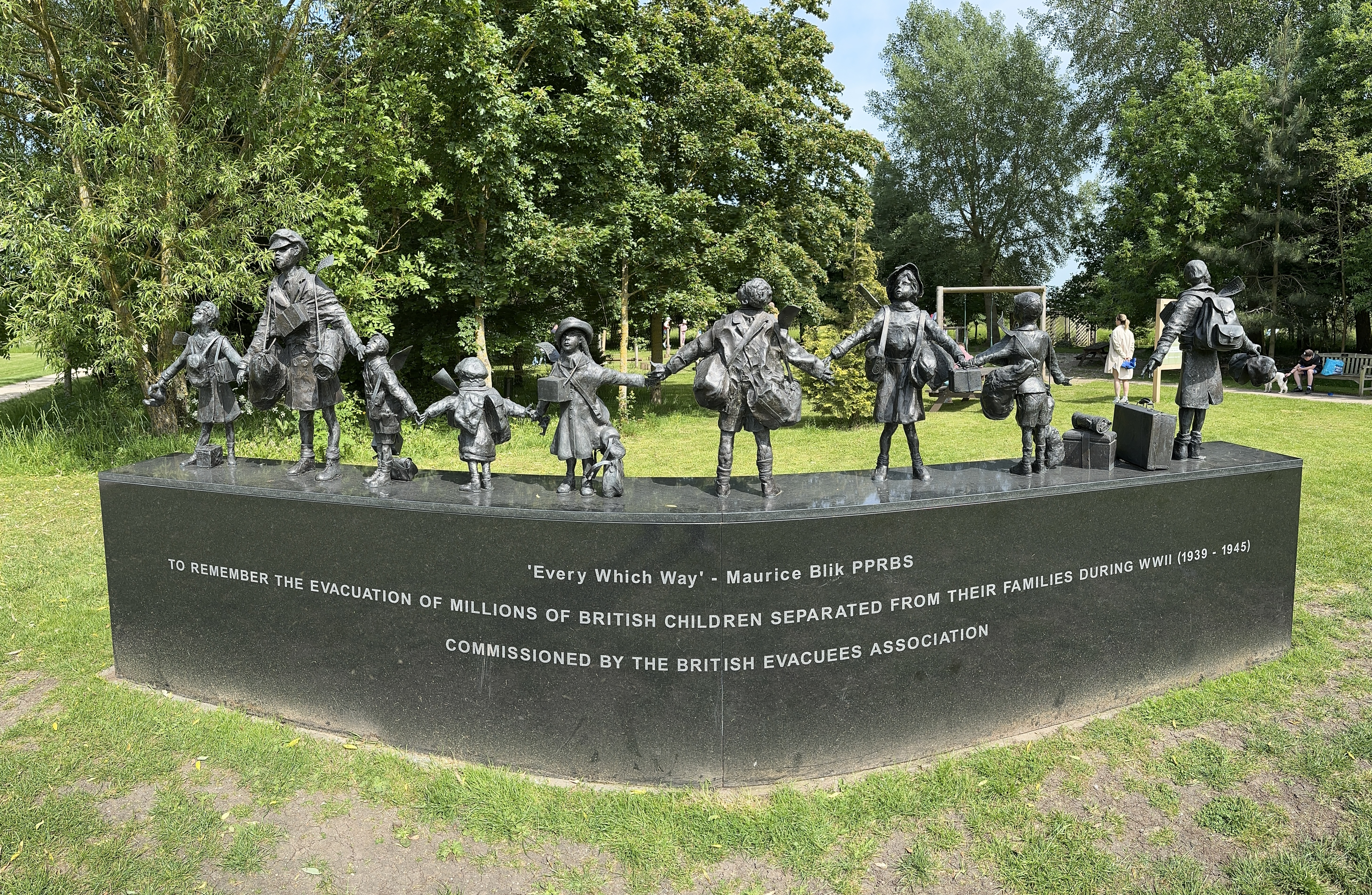
Every Which Way

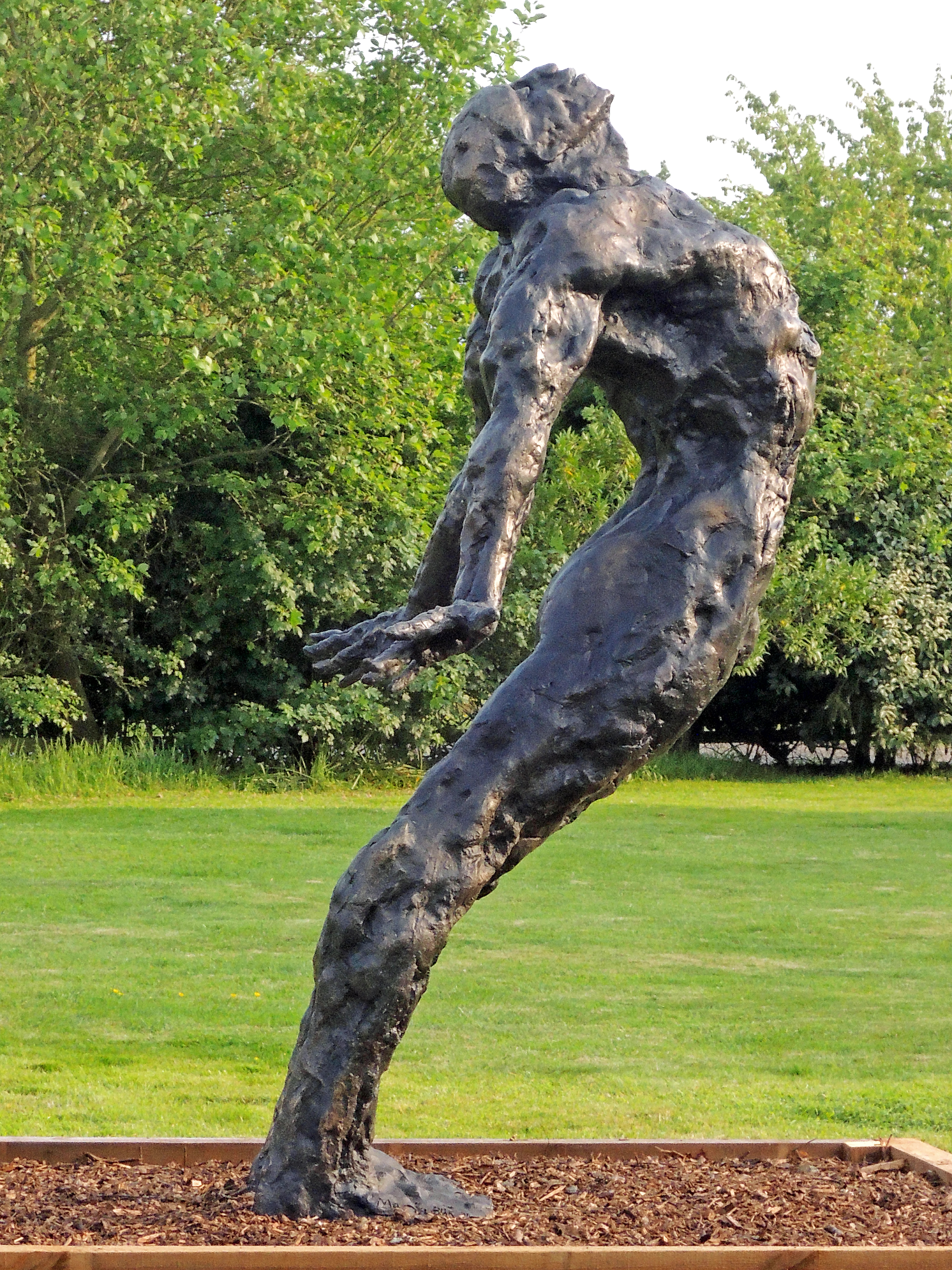
Second Breath
