= QANDA =

AI-based math problem-solving and tutoring platform

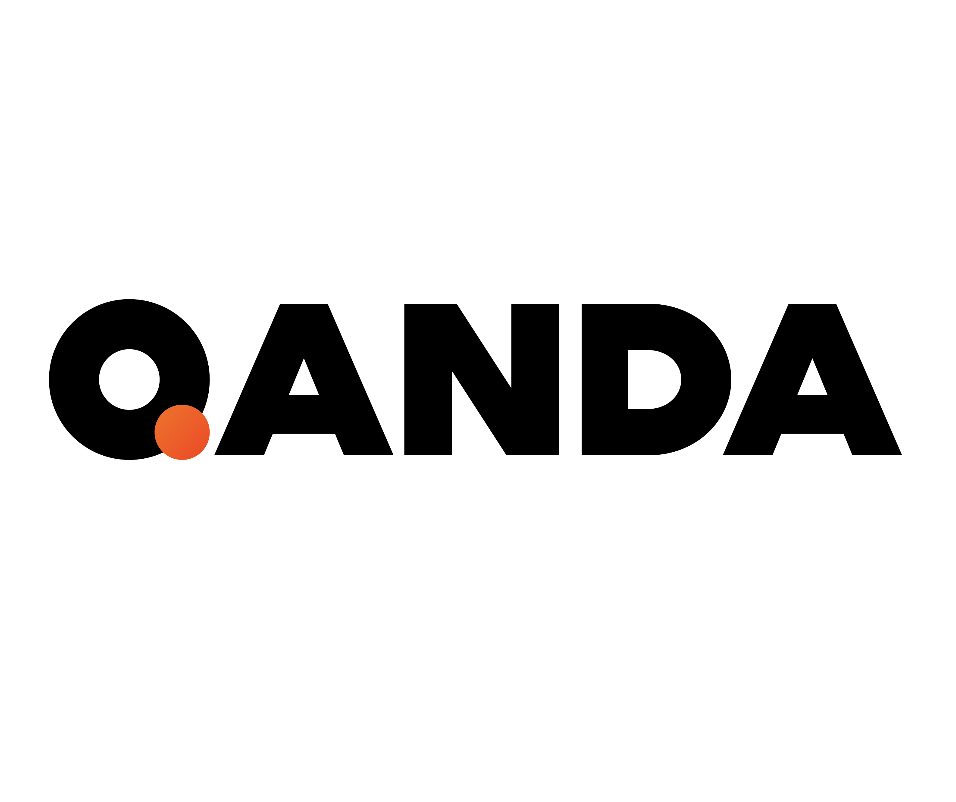
- Developers: Jongheun Lee, Yongjae Lee, Wonguk Jung, Hojae Jeong
- Release: January 2016
- Operating system: iOS, Android, Web
- Available in: Korean, English, Spanish, Indonesian, Thai, Vietnamese, Japanese
- Website: qanda.ai/en

QANDA (stands for 'Q and A') is an AI-based learning platform developed by Mathpresso Inc., a South Korea-based education technology company. Its best known feature is a solution search, which uses optical character recognition technology to scan problems and provide step-by-step solutions and learning content.

As of March 2024, QANDA solved over 6.3 billion questions. QANDA has 90 million total registered users and has reached 8 million monthly active users (MAU) in 50 countries. 90% of the cumulative users are from overseas such as Vietnam and Indonesia.

In January 2024, its MathGPT, a math-specific small large language model set a new world record, surpassed Microsoft's 'ToRA 13B', the previous record holder in benchmarks assessing mathematical performance such as 'MATH' (high school math) and 'GSM8K' (grade school math). 'MathGPT' was co-developed with Upstage and KT.

In March 2024, Mathpresso launched 'Cramify' (formerly known as Prep.Pie), an AI-powered study material generator designed to create personalized exam prep materials for U.S. college students. It uses generative AI to create customized study materials uploaded by students. Its features include a range of tools including study summarizer and question solver.

== History ==
Co-founder Jongheun ‘Ray’ Lee first came up with the idea of QANDA during his freshman year in college. While he was tutoring to earn money, Lee realized that the quality of education a student receives is greatly based on their location. Lee saw his K-12 students were regularly asking similar questions and realized that these questions were from a pre-selected number of textbooks currently being used in schools. He decided to team up with his high school friend, Yongjae ‘Jake’ Lee to build a platform whereby, one uses a mobile app to scan and submit questions, and students can ask and receive detailed responses. Lee's school friends, Wonguk Jung and Hojae Jeong, joined the team.

In June 2015, Mathpresso, Inc. was founded in Seoul, South Korea.

In January 2016, Mathpresso's first product QANDA was launched. It supported a Q&A feature between students and tutors.

In October 2017, QANDA introduced an AI-based search capability that permitted users to search for answers in seconds.

In April 2020, Jake Yongjae Lee(CEO & co-founder) and Ray Jongheun Lee (co-founder) were selected as Forbes 30 under 30 Asia.

In June 2021, QANDA raised $50 million in series C funding. Jake Yongjae Lee was recognized as an Innovator Under 35 by MIT Technology Review.

In November 2021, QANDA secured a strategic investment from Google.

Since its inception, it has received backing in Series C funding from investors namely Google, Yellowdog, GGV Capital, Goodwater Capital, KDB, and SKS Private Equity with participation from SoftBank Ventures Asia, Legend Capital, Mirae Asset Venture Investment, and Smilegate Investment.

In September 2023, Mathpresso has raised $8 million (10 billion KRW) from Korea's telecom giant, KT. The total cumulative investment is about 130 million US dollars. The partnership aims to accelerate the development of an education-specific Large Language Model. The company intends to incorporate the LLM model to fortify its AI tutor, which later will be integrated into the existing services: QANDA App, B2B & B2G Saas, and 1:1 online tutoring (QANDA Tutor).

== Features ==
QANDA features OCR-based solution search, one-on-one Q&A tutoring, a study timer.

In 2021, QANDA launched additional features, including the premium subscription model that offers unlimited “byte-sized” micro-video lectures and the community feature that enhances collaborative learning.

In 2021, QANDA launched QANDA Tutor, a tablet-based 1:1 tutoring service and QANDA Study, a 1:N online school in Vietnam.

In 2022, QANDA launched an exam prep feature that offers past exam materials from school via online. This feature is currently available in South Korea.

In August 2023, QANDA launched a beta version of an LLM-powered AI Tutor.

== Awards and recognition ==
- Best Hidden Gems of 2017 by Google Playstore
- 2018 AWS AI Startup Challenge Award
- National representative for the Google AI for Social Good APAC, 2018
- Best Self-Improvement Apps of 2018 by Google Playstore
- GSV Edtech 150 — the Most Transformational Growth Companies in Digital Learning
- Speaker at the Google App Summit, 2021
- Selected as a prospect unicorn company by Korea Technology Finance Corporation in 2023
- Winner of G20-DIA Global Pitching in 2023
- 2021, 2022, 2023 East Asia EdTech 150 by HolonIQ
