= Kozmo.com =

Former online retailer and delivery service

- Industry: Retail
- Founded: 1998
- Defunct: 2001
- Fate: Liquidation
- Headquarters: New York City, United States
- Key people: Joseph Park; Yong Kang
- Products: Online store, delivery service

Kozmo.com was a venture capital–funded online company that promised free one-hour delivery of "videos, games, DVDs, music, mags, books, food, basics and more" and Starbucks coffee in several major cities in the United States. It was founded in March 1998 by young investment bankers Joseph Park and Yong Kang in New York City, and was out of business by April 2001. The company is often cited as an example of the dot-com bubble. In January 2013, the brand was bought by Yummy.com and announced that they would relaunch soon. In March 2018, Kozmo was relaunched as a warehouse club. The Kozmo.com website is offline as of July 2023.

== Model ==
Kozmo had a business model built around the delivery of small purchased goods within an hour by bicycle, car, truck, or public transportation for no delivery fee. The model was criticized by some business analysts, who said that one-hour point-to-point delivery of small objects is extremely expensive and were skeptical that Kozmo could make a profit as long as it refused to charge delivery fees. The company countered in part that, in their target markets, savings due to not needing to rent space for retail stores would exceed delivery costs.

== History ==
Kozmo.com's headquarters was in New York City. According to documents filed with the Securities and Exchange Commission, in 1999 the company had revenue of $3.5 million, with a resulting net loss of $26.3 million. The company had raised probably about $250 million, including $28 million from a group of investors in 1999 which included Flatiron, Oak and Chase and $60 million from Amazon.com in 2000. It had entered a five-year co-marketing agreement with Starbucks in February 2000, in which it agreed to pay Starbucks $150 million ($266 million in 2025) to promote its services inside the company's coffee shops. This included up to 500 Starbucks locations to host drop-boxes in-store for video returns. Kozmo.com ended its deal in March 2001 after paying out $15 million (~$26 million in 2025). In July 2000, at the height of its business, the company operated in Atlanta, Chicago, Houston, San Francisco, Seattle, Portland, Boston, New York, Washington, D.C., San Diego, and Los Angeles. Kozmo filed an IPO with Credit Suisse First Boston, but never went public.

The company was the subject of an April 2000 report by MSNBC.com reporters Brock N. Meeks and Elliot Zaret claiming that Kozmo was redlining sections of the cities it served that were populated primarily by African Americans. Kozmo denied that race played any part in its decision on what zip codes to deliver to, saying it chose market areas based primarily on Internet penetration rates. The Equal Rights Center (ERC), the Washington, DC–based civil rights group referenced in the article, pursued the company about the allegations. Later in the year, the ERC announced a joint initiative with Kozmo and stated that "Kozmo's initial service area was not motivated by racial discrimination," and Kozmo committed $125,000 toward increased Internet availability for underserved communities.

While popular with college students and young professionals, the company failed soon after the burst of the dot-com bubble, laying off its staff of 1,100 employees and shutting down in April 2001. Employees at many of the company's 18 locations found out about the shutdown only after arriving to work their scheduled shifts and finding the doors locked. Those locations, as well as their Memphis distribution center, were soon liquidated by a veteran entertainment wholesaler from Florida.

== Post-Kozmo ==
The documentary film e-Dreams, released in June 2001, depicts the growth and fate of the company. In April 2005, former CTO Chris Siragusa launched MaxDelivery, a Kozmo-like service in downtown Manhattan specializing in the delivery of food, wine, DVDs and essentials, and is still in business as of November, 2018.

Joseph Park, former co-founder and CEO, went on to co-found Askville in 2006, which is now part of Amazon.com. Park left Amazon.com in June 2009 to become president of BibleGateway.com, which is owned by Zondervan, a Christian publisher that is a unit of HarperCollins (which is owned by News Corp.).

Yong Kang, former co-founder, returned to Wall Street, and as of June 2008 listed his occupation as investment banking at Lehman Brothers (now Barclays Capital).

Some grocery-store delivery chains offering online ordering with same-day delivery survived the dot-com bust, and in the 2010s various competing same-day delivery services started in larger U.S. cities.
