= Jon Cardella =

Chief Executive Officer & Entrepreneur

Jonathan Cardella
- Occupation: CEO of Strike Tax Advisory
- Known for: Entrepreneur and businessman

Jonathan Cardella is an entrepreneur and businessman, who is best known as Founder and Chairman of Ventive (which was named in the Inc. 5000 in 2018–2022) and Founder & CEO of its sister company, Strike Tax Advisory. He formerly owned Ski West, which was sold to Overstock.com and renamed Overstock Travel in 2005; he was retained as CEO. He also served as CIO of FixYa. Jonathan also founded and operated NeighborCity, as its CEO, which was an innovative real estate tech company that rated, ranked and recommended residential real estate agents to homebuyers and sellers. NorthstarMLS and Berkshire Hathaway Home Services sued NeighborCity and Cardella for allegedly violating copyright law by using Northstar MLS's and Berkshire Hathaways Home Service's real estate listing data without permission. The claims against Cardella were dismissed and all remaining claims were settled without admission of fault. NeighborCity's case was instrumental in paving the way for real estate startups and technology companies to safely utilize MLS data, while also bringing to light the alleged anti-competitive practices of the National Association of Realtors, Berkshire Hathaway Home Services, Nortstar MLS, and related MLSs.
