= E-Dreams =

2001 American documentary film by Wonsuk Chin

e-Dreams
- Kozmo photo shoot with Joseph Park in front
- Directed by: Wonsuk Chin
- Produced by: Wonsuk Chin
- Starring: Joseph Park; Yang Kang
- Music by: Woody Pak
- Release date: 2001
- Running time: 94 min.
- Country: United States
- Language: English

e-Dreams is a 2001 American documentary film directed by Wonsuk Chin portraying the rise and fall of Kozmo.com, an online convenience store that used bike messengers to deliver goods ordered online within an hour.

The movie follows Joseph Park and Yong Kang, 28-year-old Korean Americans, whose company started as Park's idea in 1998 and by January 1999 became a reality in a warehouse with a small group of employees and grew to 3,000 employees and an 11-city network within a year. Kozmo.com raised $280 million in capital and attracted attention from Amazon.com and Starbucks. However, the lack of a sustainable business plan and the inability to raise additional capital due to the dot-com bust and stock market correction that began in April 2000 forced the company out of business by 2001.
