= BLIK =

Russian futsal club

BLIK Nefteyugansk
- Full name: Автономная Некоммерческая Организация «Мини-футбольный клуб «БЛиК» (Autonomous Non-Profit Organization «Futsal club «BLIK»)
- Founded: 2012
- Dissolved: 2019
- Ground: SC «Zhemchuzhina Yugry», Nefteyugansk (2012–2019)
- League: Superleague
- 2018/2019: 10
Home colours	Away colours

Futsal club «BLIK» (Russian: Мини-футбольный клуб «БЛиК») was a futsal club from Nefteyugansk, Russia. The club was founded in 2012 and disbanded in 2019 by reason of finance. Participated in Russian futsal Championship 1st division, Russian cup and Russian Championship (Superleague).

== Participated in Russian championships ==
Season	Place
Russian Championship 1st Division (II)	11th (6th place in regular championship — zone «East»)
Russian Championship 1st Division (II)	2nd (1st place in regular championship — zone «East»)
Russian Championship 2018/2019 (I)	10th (was disbanded)

Russian cup (from 2016)

Season	Stage	Place
Russian cup 2016/2017	Second stage	
Russian cup 2017/2018	1/8 finals	9–16
Russian cup 2018/2019	1/8 finals	9–16

== Honours ==
- Russian Championship 1st Division:
  - Silver (1): 2017/2018
- Russian cup:
  - 1/8 finals: 2017/2018, 2018/2019
- Nefteyugansk championships:
  - Gold (5): 2012, 2013, 2014, 2015, 2016
- Surgut cup:
  - Gold (2): 2015/2016, 2016/2017, 2017/2018
- Surgut Superleague:
  - Gold (3): 2015/2016, 2016/2017, 2017/2018
- International tournament of prize SC «Ayat», Kazakhstan:
  - Silver (1): 2017/2018
- International tournament of prize Tyumen region:
  - Silver (1): 2018
