= Transaction =

Transaction or transactional may refer to:

== Commerce ==
- Financial transaction, an agreement, communication, or movement carried out between a buyer and a seller to exchange an asset for payment
- Debits and credits in a Double-entry bookkeeping system
- Electronic funds transfer, the electronic exchange or transfer of money from one account to another
- Real estate transaction, the process whereby rights in a unit of property is transferred between two or more parties
- Transaction cost, a cost incurred in making an economic exchange
- Transactional law, the practice of law concerning business and commerce

== Computing ==
- Transaction processing, information processing that is divided into individual, indivisible operations
- Database transaction, a unit of work performed within a database management system
- Atomic transaction, a series of database operations such that either all occur, or nothing occurs

== Other uses ==
- Transactions, the published proceedings of a learned society:
- Transaction Publishers, a New Jersey–based publishing house that specializes in social sciences books
- "Transaction" an episode of the Death Note anime series; see List of Death Note episodes
- Transactional analysis, a psychoanalytic theory of psychology
- Transactional interpretation, an interpretation of quantum mechanics
- Transactional leadership, a leadership style described by James MacGregor Burns
- Transaction (TV series), a British ITVX television series about a trans supermarket employee hired for diversity purposes
