= Knowledge market =

Mechanism for distributing knowledge resources

A knowledge market is a mechanism for distributing knowledge resources. There are two views on knowledge and how knowledge markets can function. One view uses a legal construct of intellectual property to make knowledge a typical scarce resource, so the traditional commodity market mechanism can be applied directly to distribute it. An alternative model is based on treating knowledge as a public good and hence encouraging free sharing of knowledge. This is often referred to as attention economy. Currently there is no consensus among researchers on relative merits of these two approaches.

== History ==
A knowledge economy include the concept of exchanging knowledge-based products and services. However, as discussed by Stewart (1996) knowledge is very different from physical products. For example, it can be in more than one place at one time, selling it does not diminish the supply, buyers only purchase it once, and once sold, it cannot be recalled. Further, knowledge begets more knowledge in a never-ending cycle. Understanding of knowledge markets is beginning to emerge. As would be expected, they are very different in form from traditional markets.

Knowledge markets have been variously described by Stewart (1996) and Simard (2000) as a mechanism for enabling, supporting, and facilitating the mobilization, sharing, or exchange of information and knowledge among providers and users.

This transactional approach assumes that knowledge-based products or services are available for distribution, that someone wants to use them, and that the primary focus of the market is to connect the two.

This perspective is appropriate when the market has limited or no interest or control over either the production or use of the content being exchanged, as is the case for most traditional markets. A provider-user perspective is also appropriate for emerging social networking "ideagoras" (Tapscott and Williams, 2006), in which the primary function of the market is to match existing solutions with problems and problems with those who can find solutions.

From a production perspective, processes for creating wealth through the use of intellectual capital are explained by Nonaka (1991) and Leonard (1998). At the marketing end of the spectrum, a number of authors, including Bishop (1996), May (2000), and Tapscott et al. (2000) describe the architecture and processes necessary to succeed in a digital economy.

Knowledge markets may also be sequential in nature. Simard (2006) describes a cyclic end-to-end knowledge-market model comprising nine stages that embed, advance, or extract value into knowledge products and services along a knowledge services value chain. The first five stages are internal to a knowledge organization (production and transfer) while the last four stages are external (intermediaries, clients, and citizens). Because the value chain is cyclic, it can be used to model either a supply (post-production evaluation ) or a demand (pre-production evaluation) approach to knowledge markets.

== Knowledge services ==
Knowledge services is an emerging concept that integrates knowledge management, a knowledge organization, and knowledge markets. Knowledge services are programs that provide content-based (data, information, knowledge) organizational outputs (e.g., advice, answers, facilitation), to meet external user wants or needs. Knowledge services are delivered through knowledge markets.

St. Clair and Reich (2002) describe internal knowledge services as a management approach that integrates information management, knowledge management, and strategic learning into an enterprise-wide function. Kalakota and Robinson (2003) and Thomas (2005) developed service-oriented architectures for the private sector. Their focus was to transform traditional retail businesses by developing enterprise-wide platforms that support customer services. RocSearch (2006) takes a broader external view, referring to a nascent knowledge services industry that goes beyond traditional cost and time leveraging advantages of the traditional consulting sector.

Simard et al. (2007) developed a holistic systems model of knowledge services for government S&T organizations. The model begins with generating new content and ends with sector outcomes and individual benefits. The model is independent of content, issues, or organizations. It is designed at a departmental level, but is scalable both upwards and downwards. The primary driver is a department's legal mandate; a secondary driver is the needs of clients and residents. The model can function from either a supply or demand approach to knowledge markets. There are two levels of resolution - performance measurement, and classifying service-related activities.

There are four types of knowledge services: generate content, develop products, provide assistance, and share solutions. 24 Knowledge services are modeled as a circular value chain comprising nine stages that embed, advance, or extract value from knowledge-based products and services. The stages are: generate, transform, manage, use internally, transfer, enhance, use professionally, use personally, and evaluate.

(Simard, 2007) described a rich to reach service delivery spectrum that is segmented into categories of recipients, with associated levels of distribution, interactions, content complexity, and channels. The categories, from rich to reach, are: unique (once only), complex (science), technical (engineering), specialized (professional), simplified (popular), and mandatory (everyone).

From the perspective of knowledge markets, Mcgee and Prusak (1993) note that people barter for information, use it as an instrument of power, or trade it for information of greater value. Davenport and Prusak (1998) used a knowledge marketplace analogy to describe the exchange of knowledge among individuals and groups. However, Shapiro and Varian (1999) indicate that information markets will not resemble textbook competitive markets with many suppliers offering similar products but lacking the ability to influence prices. Simard (2006) described knowledge markets as a group of related circular knowledge-service value chains that function collectively as a sector, to embed, advance, and extract value to yield sector outcomes and individual benefits.

=== Examples ===
Fee-based knowledge markets commoditize knowledge by being based on traditional market mechanisms that work well for traditional goods. The buyer posts a request, normally in the form of a question and sets a price for the valid answer. Alternatively, the suppliers of knowledge (answerers) can post their bids to have the question answered.

Experts-Exchange is fee-based knowledge market which using a virtual currency where buyers can offer payment to have their questions answered. Mahalo Answers, an extension of the search engine Mahalo.com, launched on December 15, 2008. The site also uses a virtual currency ("Mahalo Dollars").

Innocentive is a web-based open marketplace where firms post scientific problems and choose rewards.

Sage Board is an active American company tackling the problem from a consumer perspective. The company vets experts through web sources, social media profiles, journals, and professional profiles. It connects consumers to the vetted experts who provide paid answers, audio, or video conferencing services. Sage also provides an SEO software toolset that provides SEO analytics for digital content marketing for the experts.

Google Answers was another implementation of this idea. This service allowed its users to offer bounties to expert researchers for answering their questions. The Google site was closed in 2006. Two months later, fifty former Google Answers Researchers launched paid research/Q&A site Uclue. Google also acquired Q&A website Vark.com, to shut it down a year later.

Free knowledge markets use an alternative model treating knowledge as a public good.

Quora, Stack Overflow (and the rest of the Stack Exchange network), Ask Metafilter, Yahoo! Answers, Windows Live QnA, Wikipedia's Reference Desk, 3form Free Knowledge Exchange, Knowledge iN, and several other websites currently use the free knowledge exchange model. None of these offer more than an increase in reputation as payment for researchers.

ChaCha.com and Answerly.com both offer subsidized knowledge markets where researchers are paid to generate answers despite the service remaining free to the question asker. Amazon.com's NowNow previously offered a subsidized knowledge market for questions asked through mobile phones and as an experimental feature in the company's ebook reader, the Amazon Kindle. The NowNow service was discontinued November 21, 2008 after an extended private beta period.

== See also ==
- List of Question and Answer Websites
- Collective intelligence
- Crowdsourcing
- Digital economy
- Electronic business
- Electronic commerce
- Information economy
- Knowledge management
- Information market
- Information society
- Information systems
- Knowledge economy
- Knowledge ecosystems
- Knowledge organization
- Knowledge policy
- Virtual economy
- Private intelligence agency
- Competitive intelligence
- Social information processing
- Knowledge worker
