= The Experts Network =

Interactive digital sports network

The Experts Network, also known as TXN or TXN Sports, is an interactive digital sports network consisting of sports analysts Cris Collinsworth, Boomer Esiason, Nick Faldo, Howie Long, Cal Ripken Jr. and Phil Simms. The presenters share about topics in sports news and culture.

== NFL Draft Preview Show ==
In April 2011, Big Lead Sports, a digital sports company, partnered with The Experts Network to deliver NFL draft content through an array of different channels. On April 25, 2011, The Experts Network produced its first sports show previewing the NFL Draft. The TXN NFL Draft Preview Show was presented by Men's Wearhouse. It was streamed and promoted exclusively on its website and across Big Lead Sports's digital platforms.

== Behind the Mic ==
On October 1, 2010, TXN launched, with Turner and Allstate Insurance, Behind the Mic, a series of web-based vignettes providing analysis on news and issues in sports. Each week, the series was presented by Allstate. Additional video segments are added during each sport's respective postseasons and championships.
