= Q&A comedy website =

Generic term for a kind of website

A Q&A website is a website where the site creators use the images of pop culture icons, historical figures, fictional characters, or even inanimate objects or abstract concepts to answer input from the site's visitors, usually in question/answer format. This format of website, most popular in the early 2000s, evolved from the much older Internet Oracle. The original progenitor of this type of site was the now-defunct Forum 2000. The Forum 2000 claimed to have run the site by means of artificial intelligence, and the personalities on the website were called SOMADs, or "State Of Mind Adjointness pairs". However, later Q&A sites usually dispensed with this pretense, with the most extreme example being Jerk Squad!, on which the administrators of the site provide many of the answers.

== Individual Site Descriptions ==
=== The Conversatron ===
The Conversatron, which began to take questions December 12, 1999, was first to break the Forum 2000's format. The Conversatron made it clear that the site was not run by artificial intelligence, and it called the site's personalities "Askees", in contrast to the visitors, called "Askers". The Conversatron stated in a thread that it would be "going down for permanent maintenance" at some time in early 2005, but that it may be supplanted by something "different, but still the same." Since that time, the site has been back and forth, sometimes being replaced with the cryptic message, "So, web huh."

=== The True Meaning of Life ===
More commonly referred to by its acronym TMOL, the site was originally started in early 2000 as a version of Forum 2000 and The Conversatron, but one that focused on the idea that videogames reflected a deep, self-actualizing message that could improve one's life. The conceit of the site was that it evangelized this videogame-centric, pseudo-Buddhist philosophy via a "Virtual Meditation Chamber", where the site's visitors, or "Supplicants", would ask for the advice or the opinion of the "Gurus". Headed by the fictional "lead Guru wrangler", The Seeker, TMOL ran from July 2000 – January 2004, and the best-of archive of this run is still available online.

=== Forum 2010 ===
Initially something between a satire of and homage to the original Forum 2000, Forum 2010 made its debut on July 29, 2000. The site, which began as a college web project by Andrew Chinnici, used personas from regular patrons of the WTnet IRC channel #watertower in addition to "celebrity" personalities. A check of that site in May, 2012 took one to web host aspnix.com, whose online chat representative said could provide no further information about its client.

=== QNA2K and QNA2K10 ===
QNA2K began in 2000 as an homage to Conversatron and True Meaning of Life. It was updated until late 2002, and was removed from the internet when Yahoo! removed the GeoCities portion of its webhosting. Later, QNA2K10, a more modern interpretation of QNA2K, took its place. This site has since gone offline sometime around November 2012

=== The Hateatron and the Ministry of Misanthropy ===
The Hateatron went online January 15, 2002, at a time when many other Q&A sites were springing up. The Hateatron ran on software written by its creator Safiire Arrowny and has gone through many different incarnations since its launch. The Hateatron's defining factor was that aside from just answering questions with its characters, known as "Haters," it had a fully integrated forum called the User Owned or UO Forum. The evolution of this kind of forum was a fluke, and it turned into an extension of the Q&A format. The Haters who answered questions on the front page now sprang to life inside the UO Forum, interacting with the users who had become active in the community. The Hateatron sported a community and readership of over 100 regular users, organized a yearly convention called Hateakon, and answered nearly 5000 questions. Some time in early 2005, the Q&A portion of the Hateatron was dropped from the front page of the site for unpublicized reasons. The rest of the site has since been decommissioned, although it is still occasionally updated with bizarre messages.

The Ministry of Misanthropy was the official successor to the Hateatron, launched July 26, 2005. The Ministry's administrator was one of the former Hateatron users, and many of the other users also made the transition.

=== The Conversawang and Wangcode ===
Jason Nelson, creator of The Conversawang, released the PHP-based software used to run the site. The software, dubbed Wangcode, became open source under the GNU General Public License. Previously, the major impediment to creating a Q&A website was that each site had its own unique, proprietary software. Once the code became available, numerous Q&A sites sprouted up, many of them outliving the Conversawang. An example of a Wangcode-based site is Deuce Tre – Conspiratron.

Other Q&A sites started out using Wangcode but ended up rewriting the entire back-end at one point or another. Jerk Squad launched an improved back-end in August 2004, though the code was not made publicly available. The back-end used for Ask Dr. Science, codenamed Beakertron was expected to be released under the GNU General Public License by its author, David Perry. However, several years have passed since its future availability was first announced.

== List of Q&A Sites ==
Q&A Websites
Site	First Launched	Last Answered
Ask Dr. Science	2002-08	Unknown
The Conversatron	1999-12-12	Unknown
Conversawang	2001-06	Unknown
Deuce Tre Conspiratron	2003	Unknown
Forum 2000	1996-11	2000
Forum 2010	2000-07-29	Unknown
Geeks in the Big Yellow House	2001-08	2003–06
The Internet Oracle	Unknown	Unknown
The Hateatron	Unknown	Unknown
Jerk Squad!	Unknown	2006-01-24
The Knowledge Filter	Unknown	Unknown
Master Ninja	Unknown	Unknown
Ministry of Misanthropy	2005-07	2016-08-31
Moral Minority	Unknown	Unknown
QNA2K	Unknown	Unknown
QNA2K10	Unknown	Unknown
Subnova Mind Fire	Unknown	Unknown
True Meaning of Life	2000-07	2004–01
World Wide Worb	2003-04-02	2004-03-13
