= Joseph Park (businessman) =

Korean American investment banker

Joseph Park (born c. 1972) is a Korean American investment banker who founded Kozmo.com in 1997. He was profiled in the documentary film e-Dreams. He was a co-founder of Askville, which was owned by Amazon.com and closed in 2013. In late June 2009, he left Amazon to work for Zondervan as president of biblegateway.com, which Zondervan acquired in November 2008 from Gospel Communications International.

As of 2022, Park works for Samsung in South Korea as Corporate EVP of Global Customer Marketing.
