= BlikBook =

BlikBook is an online platform used in higher education to enable improved student engagement. As of October 2013 is estimated to be used in more than a third of universities in the UK and all Irish universities. Founded in 2010, BlikBook is a platform which connects students and their lecturers in Higher Education based on what they are learning.

== History ==
BlikBook was co-founded in 2010 by Cheyne Tan, Barnaby Voss, Deepak Colluru and Ben Hall. It emerged from a research project at London Business School (LBS) and University College London (UCL) which focused on how students learn and engage with content. The concept for BlikBook was developed whilst the founders were studying some difficult lecture material. Unable to get the answers to their questions without contacting a number of their peers and eventually the lecturer, they became motivated to create a more efficient process for students and lecturers to interact outside of the lecture theatre . In 2011, Rene Olivieri, former CEO of Blackwell Publishing, COO of Wiley Blackwell and current Higher Education Funding Council for England (HEFCE) board member, joined as Chairman of BlikBook. BlikBook is a multinational business with offices in Dublin and London. It was founded in the UK, but relocated its head office to Dublin in August 2013. The move followed a €1 million funding round from mainly Irish investors, Leaf Investments, Delta Partners and Enterprise Ireland. This was the second round of investment for BlikBook, having received initial funding from investors, including Forward Investment Partners and Rene Olivieri, in 2011.

== Features ==
BlikBook's design and features are aimed at maximising the engagement of students

- asking questions – anonymously or directly, to the lecturer or to the whole class;
- sharing web articles and discussing them;
- announcements posted by lecturers;
- following answers/questions -user receives updates when there are any other answers or comments to it;
- lecturer recommendations – highlighting specific questions/answers;
- links to course books;
- eliminating duplicate questions;
- customised personal email digests on the important activity from a course;
- analytics to help lecturers monitor class engagement and performance;
- user-centric design;
- design that works on mobile, tablet and desktop;
- integration with other VLEs (virtual learning platforms).

== Service ==
BlikBook is a service aimed at solving problems for the three prominent groups of the academic community – students, lecturers and universities. BlikBook facilitates questions and discussion amongst the students and lecturers from specific modules. BlikBook's philosophy is that by helping students to interact more with one another it will improve their educational experience and reduce lecturers’ workloads. This type of online learning can help lecturers to monitor the progression of students and advise them when needed. The belief is that this then assists the university by increasing student satisfaction, student academic performance, lecturer teaching marks and freeing up academic resources.
