= Yalwa =

Worldwide business directory

- Company type: Private
- Industry: Local Internet Websites
- Founded: June 2006
- Headquarters: Wiesbaden, Germany
- Products: Yalwa Business Directory, Locanto Classifieds Site, askalo Local Q&A

Yalwa is a worldwide business directory where companies can list their business and advertise within their local neighborhoods. The Yalwa Business Directory is available in over 50 countries worldwide, covering 5 major languages.

Klaus P. Gapp is the CEO and founder of Yalwa.

== Overview ==
In the Yalwa business directory, small business owners can list their companies. Yalwa has a thousand different categories to specify what kinds of products or services the listed businesses offer.

== Background ==
The Yalwa business directory is operated by the German company Yalwa located in Wiesbaden, Germany. Yalwa was launched in June 2007 in 12 English-speaking countries. Within the following year, Yalwa launched in 16 more countries and was made available in Spanish, German, Dutch, and French. By December 2009, Yalwa had increased its presence by 10 more countries, totaling 38 countries across five languages. By 2014, Yalwa had expanded into over 50 countries worldwide.

== Other references ==
- Yalwa Press Release Retrieved 28 Dez 2010
- Your-Story.org Retrieved 02 Jan 2011
- Press Release on Yalwa Expansion Retrieved 02 Jan 2011
- B2B Online Magazine, Online business directories: an important SMB investment Retrieved 07 Jan 2011
- Review on Killerstartups.com Retrieved 28 Dez 2010
- Yalwa on Startupwiki (in German) Retrieved 28 Dez 2010
- Article on deutsche-startups.de (in German) Retrieved 07 Jan 2010
- Article from 28 Dez 2012 on Wiesbadener Kurier (in German) Retrieved 01 Jan 2013
- Yalwa
