= Physics Forums =

Physics question-and-answer website

- Website type: Question and answer
- Headquarters: USA
- Owner: Greg Bernhardt
- Website: www.physicsforums.com
- Commercial: No
- Registration: Optional
- Users: 200,000
- Launched: 2001; 25 years ago

Physics Forums is a question and answer Internet forum that allows users to ask, answer and comment on grade-school through graduate-level science questions. In addition, Physics Forums hosts the Insights Blog which is a collaborative blog sourced from verified experts on the community.

Authors of scientific papers have used Physics Forums to write popular explanations of their research. In turn, this forum entries have been referenced by popular science news websites. Notable members and blog authors past and present include John C. Baez, Urs Schreiber, Antony Garrett Lisi. Physics Forums entries have also been cited in scientific papers.

== History ==
Physics Forums was started as a school project in the spring of 2001 by Greg Bernhardt.

Physics Forums entered content partnerships with Scientific American magazine in 2005.

In 2025, two writers on the blog "Hall of Impossible Dreams" wrote that Physics Forums had been using large language models (LLMs) to generate content, posting it via abandoned user accounts. They wrote that some posts were backdated by over a decade, creating the false impression that the posts were written by humans. After some denial and deflection by others, Greg Bernhardt eventually admitted that the data analysis was indeed correct and took responsibility for the violation of users' trust by directing AI LLMs to "use real accounts" in order "to counter declining engagement".

=== Awards ===
Physics Forums won the 2010 "People's Choice" award for best Q&A online physics community by physics.org.

As of 2023, Physics Forums is ranked 8th on "Aelieve's List of 20 Best Physics Websites".

== See also ==
- MathOverflow
- Stack Exchange
- nLab
- PhysicsOverflow
