= Glitch, Inc. =

American software company

- Formerly: Fog Creek Software, Inc.
- Type: Subsidiary
- Industry: Software
- Founded: 2000
- Founders: Joel Spolsky; Michael Pryor
- Defunct: 2022
- Fate: Acquired by Fastly
- Headquarters: New York
- Key people: Joel Spolsky (Board Member, Co-Founder); Anil Dash (CEO); Jordan Harris (COO); Alexa Scordato, (VPM)
- Products: Glitch, Stack Overflow, Stack Exchange, Trello, FogBugz
- Number of employees: 14 (2022)
- Website: glitch.com

Glitch, Inc., previously known as Fog Creek Software, Inc. was a software company specializing in project management tools. Its products included project management and content management, and code review tools. Fastly acquired the company in 2022, however, the company announced it was shutting down in July 2025.

== History ==
The company's original name was Fog Creek. Based in New York City, Fog Creek was founded in 2000 as a consulting company by Joel Spolsky and Michael Pryor. As the consulting market started to dry up due to the collapse of the Dot-com bubble, Fog Creek moved to a product-based business. In December 2016 Anil Dash was appointed CEO. Fog Creek's offices are located in the Financial District of Manhattan. On September 25, 2018, the company was officially renamed Glitch after its flagship product. Glitch staff announced intentions to unionize with the Communications Workers of America in early 2020 as part of the Campaign to Organize Digital Employees. The company voluntarily recognized their union. Around the same time, the company laid off a third of its staff during the COVID-19 pandemic. In February 2021, Glitch workers signed a collective bargaining agreement with the company. According to the Communications Workers of America (CWA), this is the first agreement signed by white collar tech workers in the United States.

Cloud services Fastly, known for its content delivery network, acquired Glitch, as announced in May 2022. CEO Anil Dash became Fastly's VP of developer experience. Glitch's staff had declined since 2020 from 50 to 14 employees, all of whom joined Fastly. The union dissolved prior to the acquisition when its collective bargaining agreement expired and the union's three remaining members decided not to pursue another agreement.

== FogCreek Products ==
=== FogBugz ===
FogBugz is an integrated web-based project management system featuring bug and issue tracking, discussion forums, wikis, customer relationship management, and evidence-based scheduling developed by Fog Creek Software. It was briefly rebranded as Manuscript in 2017, which was acquired in 2018 and was renamed back to FogBugz.

=== CityDesk ===
CityDesk was a website management software package. The backend of the system ran as a desktop application written on Windows in Visual Basic 6.0 with all data stored in a Microsoft Jet database. It was one of FogCreek's first products, first announced in 2001.

=== Copilot ===
Fog Creek Copilot was a remote assistance service offered by Fog Creek Software. It launched on August 8, 2005.

Originally known as Project Aardvark, Fog Creek Copilot was developed by a group of summer interns at Fog Creek Software. Fog Creek's founder, Joel Spolsky, wanted to give his interns the experience of taking a project through its entire lifecycle from inception, to mature released product. The interns set up a blog, called Project Aardvark, where they posted updates on the progress of their project, even though at that time the details were still secret.

On July 1, 2005, the Project Aardvark team revealed that they were working on a remote assistance system for consumer use.

Fog Creek Copilot uses a heavily modified version of TightVNC, a variant of Virtual Network Computing (VNC), as its core protocol.

On November 7, 2005, a documentary on the interns' summer, titled Aardvark'd: 12 Weeks with Geeks, was released. It was produced by Lerone D. Wilson of Boondoggle Films.

In 2014 Fog Creek restructured, spinning Copilot out as a separate company.

In 2022, Copilot announced it was closing and that the domain name had been sold.

=== Stack Overflow ===
In 2008, Jeff Atwood and Joel Spolsky created Stack Overflow, a question-and-answer Web site for computer programming questions, which they described as an alternative to the programmer forum Experts-Exchange.

Stack Overflow serves as a platform for users to ask and answer questions, and, through membership and active participation, to vote questions and answers up or down and edit questions and answers in a fashion similar to a wiki or Digg. Users of Stack Overflow can earn reputation points and "badges" when another user votes up a question or answer they provided.

As of September 2020, Stack Overflow has over 12,000,000 registered users and more than 20,100,000 questions. Based on the type of tags assigned to questions, the top ten most discussed topics on the site are: JavaScript, Java, Python, C#, PHP, Android, HTML, jQuery, C++, and CSS.

Following the success of Stack Overflow they started additional sites in 2009 based on the Stack Overflow model: Server Fault for questions related to system administration and Super User for questions from computer "power users".

In June 2021, Prosus acquired Stack Overflow for $1.8 billion.

=== Stack Exchange ===
In September 2009, Fog Creek Software released a beta version of the Stack Exchange 1.0 platform as a way for third parties to create their own communities based on the software behind Stack Overflow, with monthly fees. This white label service was not successful, with few customers and slowly growing communities.

In May 2010, Stack Overflow was spun-off as its own new company, Stack Exchange Inc., and raised $6 million in venture capital from Union Square Ventures and other investors, and it switched its focus to developing new sites for answering questions on specific subjects.

=== Trello ===
In 2011, Fog Creek released Trello, a collaborative project management hosted web application that operated under a freemium business model. Trello was cross-subsidized by the company's other products. A basic service is provided free of charge, and a Business Class paid-for service was launched in 2013.

In July 2014, Fog Creek Software spun off Trello as its own company operating under the name of Trello, Inc. Trello Inc. raised $10.3 million in funding from Index Ventures and Spark Capital.

In January 2017, Atlassian announced it was acquiring Trello for $425 million.

== Glitch Products ==
On September 25, 2018, the company was officially renamed Glitch, Inc.

=== Glitch (application) ===
The Glitch web application (formerly HyperDev) launched in the spring of 2017 as a place for people to build simple web applications using JavaScript. While JavaScript is the only supported language, other languages can be unofficially used. Pitched as a "view source" tool that lets users "recombine code in useful ways". Glitch is an online IDE for JavaScript and Node.js and includes instant hosting, automated deployment and live help from community members. IDE features include live editing, hosting, sharing, automatic source versioning, and Git integration. Glitch focuses on being a friendly, accessible community; since its launch over a million people have used the site to make web applications. The Glitch site is self-hosting (except for the editor and API), allowing users to view or remix the site's source code.

In December 2018, Mozilla announced that it will retire Thimble, Mozilla's browser-based educational code editor, and asked users to migrate all of their projects to Glitch. Thimble was shut down in December 2019 and its projects were migrated to Glitch.

In early 2020, Glitch released a paid plan, known as "boosted apps". Users can pay 8 dollars a month to have projects with more RAM, more storage, and no wake up screen.

In May 2025, Glitch announced it will end project hosting on July 8, 2025, while continuing to provide downloads until the end of the year.

In January 2026, Glitch was fully shut down.

== See also ==
- Comparison of remote desktop software
- Tech companies in the New York metropolitan area
