= PhysicsOverflow =

- Website type: Question and answer Open peer review
- Owner: Roger Cattin
- Creators: Abhimanyu Pallavi Sudhir, Rahel Knoepfel and Roger Cattin
- Website: physicsoverflow.org
- Commercial: No
- Registration: Optional
- Launched: April 2014; 12 years ago
- Content license: User contributions under CC BY-SA 3.0

PhysicsOverflow is a physics website that serves as a post-publication open peer review platform for research papers in physics, as well as a collaborative blog and online community of physicists. It allows users to ask, answer and comment on graduate-level physics questions, post and review manuscripts from ArXiv (which lists PhysicsOverflow discussion pages among its trackbacks) and other sources, and vote on both forms of content.

In addition to the two primary forms of content, the PhysicsOverflow community also welcomes discussions on unsolved problems, and hosts a chat section for discussions on topics generally of interest to physicists and students of physics, such as those related to recent events in physics, physics academia, and the publishing process.

== History ==
PhysicsOverflow was started in April 2014 as a physics-equivalent of MathOverflow by Rahel Knöpfel, a physics PhD at the University of Rostock, high-school student Abhimanyu Pallavi Sudhir, and Roger Cattin, a retired professor of computer science at the University of Applied Sciences, Switzerland. The site was initially a mere question-and-answer forum, as it was started by users dissatisfied by the policies of the Physics Stack Exchange, but it was eventually expanded to include a Reviews section in October 2014.

== Moderation practices ==
PhysicsOverflow is well-known for its liberal moderation policy and hesitation to block contributors except for spam, as reflected in the website's bill of "user rights". The content is largely community-moderated, much like MathOverflow, although exceptions have been recorded.

Although the site's moderation policy is publicly available as part of the moderator manual, the site has been criticised for the excessive dispersion of policy-related material, such as the FAQ, the Bill of Rights, the moderator list and the Community Moderation threads, leading to reduced transparency. In response, the site's administrators posted a bulletin of all moderation-related content on the site on the homepage.

== Technical details ==
The PhysicsOverflow discus as it appears in the PhysicsOverflow logo

PhysicsOverflow runs Question2Answer, an open-source Q&A software, with a custom theme and several plugins and patches. Some of its plugins have been used by other Question2Answer websites, such as the Open Science Q&A and the Physics Problems Q&A.

== Usage ==
Quantcast records around 3000 monthly visitors and between 20,000 and 50,000 global page views to PhysicsOverflow every month, over half of whom are located in four countries: the United States (26.8%), India (9.2%), the United Kingdom (8.5%), and Germany (6.4%). However, according to PhysicsOverflow's own data, only around 1500 users actually contribute content to the site, and 440 are active at a given point in time.

== Recognition ==
The creation of PhysicsOverflow was well-received by the MathOverflow community. PhysicsOverflow was also featured at the 5th Offtopicarium and World Scientific's Asia-Pacific Physics News Letter.

- John Baez suggested the website as a platform for discussing research-level physics questions.
- Greg Bernhardt, the founder of Physics Forums, acknowledged the site as a "very interesting development for the physics discussion communities".
- Arnold Neumaier, a professor at the University of Vienna, employs PhysicsOverflow as the platform for discussion about his Theoretical Physics FAQ.
- String theorist Lubos Motl referred to the website as a "very promising competition [to Physics Stack Exchange]".
- Urs Schreiber publicised the site, claiming it could act as a catalyst to make physics academia more open like mathematics.

== See also ==
- MathOverflow
- Stack Exchange
- nLab
