= Stack Overflow =

Question-and-answer website for programmers

Stack Exchange, Inc.
- Logo since February 2026

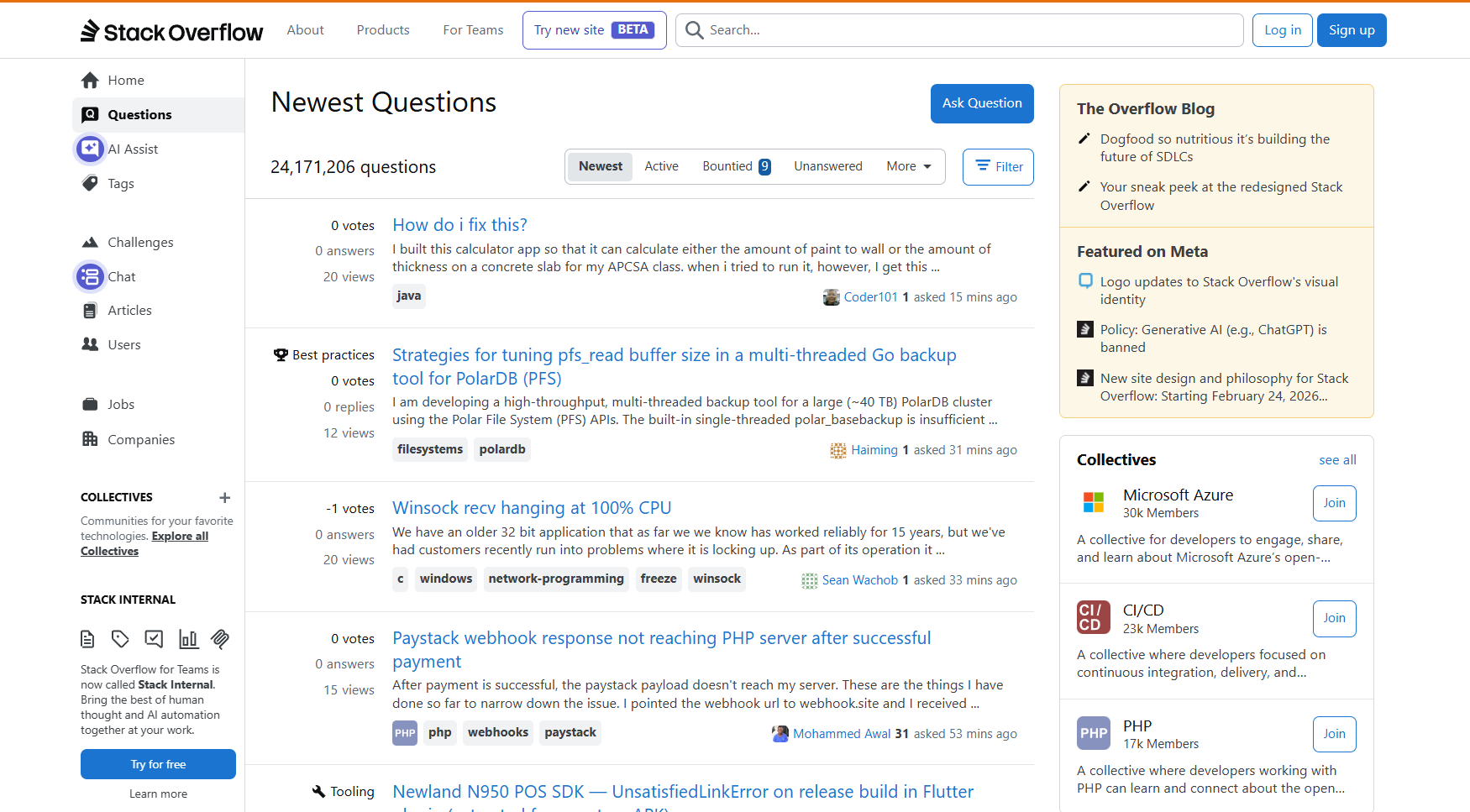
- Screenshot in February 2026
- Website type: Knowledge market Question and answer
- Available in: English; Spanish; Russian; Portuguese; Japanese
- Owner: Prosus
- Creators: Jeff Atwood and Joel Spolsky
- CEO: Prashanth Chandrasekar
- Website: stackoverflow.com
- Commercial: Yes
- Registration: Optional
- Launched: 15 September 2008; 18 years ago
- Content license: CC BY-SA 2.5 (until April 2011); CC BY-SA 3.0 (until May 2018); CC BY-SA 4.0
- Written in: C#

Stack Overflow is a question-and-answer website for computer programmers. Created in 2008 by Jeff Atwood and Joel Spolsky, it is the flagship site of the Stack Exchange network. Stack Overflow features questions and answers on certain computer programming topics, and was created to be a more open alternative to earlier question-and-answer websites such as Experts-Exchange. The website was sold to Prosus, a Netherlands-based consumer-internet conglomerate, on 2 June 2021 for US$1.8 billion.

Stack Overflow serves as a platform for users to ask and answer questions, and, through membership and active participation, to vote questions and answers up or down similar to Reddit and edit questions and answers in a fashion similar to a wiki. Users of the website can earn reputation points and "badges"; for example, a person is awarded 10 reputation points for receiving an "up" vote on a question or an answer to a question, and can receive badges for their valued contributions, which represents a gamification of the traditional Q&A website. Users unlock new privileges with an increase in reputation like the ability to vote, comment, and even edit other people's posts.

As of June 2025, Stack Overflow has over 29 million registered users, and has received over 24 million questions and 36 million answers. The site and similar programming question-and-answer sites globally largely replaced programming books for day-to-day programming reference in the 2000s, and were an important part of computer programming. Based on the type of tags assigned to questions, the top eight most-discussed topics on the site are JavaScript, Java, C#, PHP, Android, Python, jQuery, and HTML.

During the 2020s, Stack Overflow substantially declined as a result of the emergence of AI coding tools, resulting in the number of questions being asked per month dropping from over a 100,000 per month in 2022 to only a few thousand by early 2026.

== History ==
Logo until February 2026

The website was created by Jeff Atwood and Joel Spolsky in 2008. The name for the website was chosen by voting in April 2008 by readers of Coding Horror, Atwood's programming blog. On 31 July 2008, Jeff Atwood sent out invitations encouraging his subscribers to take part in the private beta of the new website, limiting its use to those willing to test out the new software. On 15 September 2008 it was announced that the public beta version was in session and that the general public was now able to use it to seek assistance on programming related issues. The design of the Stack Overflow logo was decided by a voting process.

On 3 May 2010, it was announced that Stack Overflow had raised $6 million in venture capital from a group of investors led by Union Square Ventures.

In 2019, Stack Overflow named Prashanth Chandrasekar as its chief executive officer and Teresa Dietrich as its chief product officer.

In June 2021, Prosus, a Netherlands-based subsidiary of South African media company Naspers, announced a deal to acquire Stack Overflow for $1.8 billion.

=== Security breach ===
In early May 2019, an update was deployed to Stack Overflow's development version. It contained a bug which allowed an attacker to grant themselves privileges in accessing the production version of the site. Stack Overflow published on their blog that approximately 184 public network users were affected by this breach, which "could have returned IP address, names, or emails".

=== 2023 controversy over AI-generated content and moderation strike ===
In mid-2023, Stack Exchange made several changes regarding its policies around content generated by artificial intelligence which resulted in a strike of a portion of its volunteer moderators. The protest centered around a policy posted to moderators on May 29 stating that the use of AI-detection tools was not permitted as part of moderation. In a statement, Stack Exchange confirmed that 11% of moderators had ceased content moderation in response to this policy. This would grow to more than 23% of all moderators on the network by June 22, including more than 70% of all Stack Overflow moderators.

The strike began with a post to Meta Stack Exchange, which raised concerns regarding the quality and accuracy of AI-generated content, and the lack of transparency from Stack Exchange surrounding this policy change. Moderators also stated that the version of the policy released to the public differed from the version they had received on the moderator-only forum, notably in that the public version did not include language requiring that moderators stop restricting all AI content.

Negotiations between Stack Exchange and moderators resulted in new policies allowing moderators to remove AI content when there is a strong indicator of GPT usage, and a commitment from the site to continue to provide data and API access. At the conclusion of negotiations, the strike ended on August 2, 2023.

== Content ==
Stack Overflow only accepts questions about programming that are tightly focused on a specific problem. Questions of a broader nature—or those inviting answers that are inherently a matter of opinion—are usually rejected by the site's users, and marked as closed. The sister site softwareengineering.stackexchange.com is intended to be a venue for broader queries, e.g. general questions about software development.

Closing questions is a main differentiation from other Q&A sites like Yahoo! Answers and a way to prevent low quality questions. The mechanism was overhauled in 2013; questions edited after being put "on hold" now appear in a review queue. Jeff Atwood stated in 2010 that duplicate questions are not seen as a problem but rather they constitute an advantage if such additional questions drive extra traffic to the site by multiplying relevant keyword hits in search engines.

All user-generated content is licensed under Creative Commons Attribute-ShareAlike license, version 2.5, 3.0, or 4.0 depending on the date the content was contributed.

== Statistics ==
Top Stack Overflow tags

A 2013 study has found that 75% of users only ask one question, 65% only answer one question, and only 8% of users answer more than 5 questions. To empower a wider group of users to ask questions and then answer, Stack Overflow created a mentorship program resulting in users having a 50% increase in score on average. As of 2011, 92% of the questions were answered, in a median time of 11 minutes.

As of August 2012, 443,000 of the 1.3 million registered users had answered at least one question, and of those, approximately 6,000 (0.46% of the total user count) had earned a reputation score greater than 5000. Reputation can be gained fastest by answering questions related to tags with lower expertise density, doing so promptly (in particular being the first one to answer a question), being active during off-peak hours, and contributing to diverse areas.

As of June 2026, the number of questions submitted by users per month declined over 99% from its peak in 2014. According to some, the site's perceived hostile moderation culture, as well as competition from generative AI tools, have contributed to this decline. Per the 2026 Stack Overflow Developer Survey, the majority of respondents visit the site less often for simple questions, nearly 30% contribute less than before, but a small segment of respondents visit the site more to verify generative AI answers.

View source data.

== Technology ==
Stack Overflow is written in C# using the ASP.NET MVC (Model–View–Controller) framework, and Microsoft SQL Server for the database and the Dapper Object relational mapper used for data access. Unregistered users have access to most of the site's functionality, while users who sign in can gain access to more functionality, such as asking or answering a question, establishing a profile and being able to earn reputation to allow functionality like editing questions and answers without peer review or voting to close a question.

== Reception ==
Stack Overflow won the 2020 Webby People's Voice Award for Community in the category Web.

The site's culture has been criticized in the past for being unfriendly by one research paper, especially in the context of gender differences in participation and beginners learning computer science. A 2023 study by another researcher concluded that the website's new users were met with significant difficulties in obtaining help from other users in posts started by the former; an analysis from a sample of 968 posts showed that 49% experienced hurdles such as their questions being closed, receiving no response, or receiving no mention as to why their posts were being negatively scored.

A study from the University of Maryland found that Android developers that used only Stack Overflow as their programming resource tended to write less secure code than those who used only the official Android developer documentation from Google, while developers using only the official Android documentation tended to write significantly less functional code than those who used only Stack Overflow.

== See also ==
- Askbot (free engine)
- List of Internet forums
- MathOverflow and PhysicsOverflow
- Rosetta Code (multi-lingual algorithms)
