= ∞-Chern–Weil theory =

Combination of higher category theory with Chern–Weil theory

In mathematics, ∞-Chern–Weil theory is a generalized formulation of Chern–Weil theory from differential geometry using the formalism of higher category theory. The theory is named after Shiing-Shen Chern and André Weil, who first constructed the Chern–Weil homomorphism in the 1940s, although the generalization was not developed by them.

== Generalization ==
There are three equivalent ways to describe the $k$-th Chern class of complex vector bundles of rank $n$, which is as a:

- (1-categorical) natural transformation $[-,\operatorname{BU}(n)]\Rightarrow[-,K(\mathbb{Z},2k)]$
- homotopy class of a continuous map $\operatorname{BU}(n)\rightarrow K(\mathbb{Z},2k)$
- singular cohomology class in $H^{2k}(\operatorname{BU}(n),\mathbb{Z})$

$\operatorname{BU}(n)$ is the classifying space for the unitary group $\operatorname{U}(n)$ and $K(\mathbb{Z},2k)$ is an Eilenberg–MacLane space, which represent the set of complex vector bundles of rank $n$ with $[-,\operatorname{BU}(n)]\cong\operatorname{Vect}_\mathbb{C}^n(-)$ and singular cohomology with $[-,K(\mathbb{Z},2k)] \cong H^{2k}(-,\mathbb{Z})$. The equivalence between the former two descriptions is given by the Yoneda lemma. The equivalence between the latter two descriptions is given again by the classification of singular cohomology by Eilenberg–MacLane spaces. The singular cohomology class corresponding to the Chern class is that of the universal vector bundle, hence $c_k(\gamma_\mathbb{C}^n) \in H^{2k}(\operatorname{BU}(n),\mathbb{Z})$.

A simple example motivating the necessity for a wider view and the description by higher structures is the classifying space $\operatorname{BU}(1) \cong\mathbb{C}P^\infty$. It has a H-space structure, which is unique up to homotopy, so one can again consider its classifying space, which is denoted $\operatorname{B^2U}(1)$. Due to this property, $\operatorname{U}(1) \cong S^1$is a 2-group and $\operatorname{B^2U}(1)$ is a Lie 2-groupoid. Going to the classifying space shifts the homotopy group up, hence $\operatorname{U}(1)$, $\operatorname{BU}(1)$ and $\operatorname{B^2U}(1)$ are the Eilenberg–MacLane spaces $K(\mathbb{Z},1)$, $K(\mathbb{Z},2)$ and $K(\mathbb{Z},3)$ respectively. Describing the Eilenberg–MacLane space $K(\mathbb{Z},2k)$ therefore requires repeating this process, for which switching to ∞-groups is necessary. Since loop spaces shift the homotopy group down, the classifying space in the ∞-category $\operatorname{Top}$ of topological spaces is in general known as delooping. In the ∞-topos $\infty\operatorname{Grpd}$ of ∞-groupoids, it corresponds to forming the ∞-category with a single object.

== ∞-Chern–Weil homomorphism ==
Let $\mathbf{H}$ be a ∞-topos. The fundamental ∞-groupoid $\Pi\colon\mathbf{H}\rightarrow\infty\operatorname{Grpd}$ has a right adjoint $\operatorname{Disc}\colon \infty\operatorname{Grpd}\rightarrow\mathbf{H}$, which again has a right adjoint $\Gamma\colon \mathbf{H}\rightarrow\infty\operatorname{Grpd}$, so $\Pi\dashv\operatorname{Disc}\dashv\Gamma$. Let $\textstyle\int :=\operatorname{Disc}\circ\Pi\colon \mathbf{H}\rightarrow\mathbf{H}$ and $\flat :=\operatorname{Disc}\circ\Gamma\colon \mathbf{H}\rightarrow\mathbf{H}$, then there is an adjunction $\textstyle\int\dashv\flat$.

Let $G$ be an ∞-group and $\mathbf{B}G$ its delooping. A characteristic class is a morphism $c\colon \mathbf{B}G\rightarrow\mathbf{B}^n\operatorname{U}(1)$. The counit of $\operatorname{Disc}\dashv\Gamma$ provides a canonical map $\flat\mathbf{B}G\rightarrow\mathbf{B}G$. Its homotopy fiber, which gives the obstruction to the existence of flat lifts, is denoted $\flat_\mathrm{dR}\mathbf{B}G$ (with dR standing for de Rham), so there is a sequence $\flat_\mathrm{dR}\mathbf{B}G\rightarrow\flat\mathbf{B}G\rightarrow\mathbf{B}G$. In case of $G=\mathbf{B}^{n-1}\operatorname{U}(1)$, there is also a connecting morphism $\operatorname{curv}\colon\mathbf{B}^n\operatorname{U}(1)\rightarrow\flat_\mathrm{dR}\mathbf{B}^{n+1}\operatorname{U}(1)$ called curvature, which extends the sequence and even connects all of them into a single long sequence. For an ∞-group $G$, the composition:

$$\operatorname{curv}\circ c\colon
\mathbf{B}G\rightarrow\flat_\mathrm{dR}\mathbf{B}^{n+1}\operatorname{U}(1)$$

is the ∞-Chern–Weil homomorphism. Through postcomposition, it assigns a $G$-principal ∞-bundle $X\rightarrow\mathbf{B}G$ a de Rham cohomology class $X\rightarrow\flat_\mathrm{dR}\mathbf{B}^{n+1}\operatorname{U}(1)$, alternatively written as a morphism $H(X,G)\rightarrow H_\mathrm{dR}^{n+1}(X)$ with intrinsic and de Rham cohomology:

$$H(X,G)
:=\pi_0\mathbf{H}(X,\mathbf{B}G);$$
$$H_\mathrm{dR}^n(X,G)
:=\pi_0\mathbf{H}(X,\flat_\mathrm{dR}\mathbf{B}G).$$

Additionally, there is also flat differential $G$-valued cohomology:

$$H_\mathrm{flat}(X,G)
:=\pi_0\mathbf{H}(X,\flat\mathbf{B}G)
\cong\pi_0\mathbf{H}(\textstyle\int X,\mathbf{B}G)
=H(\textstyle\int X,G)$$

with the canonical morphism $\flat\mathbf{B}G\rightarrow\mathbf{B}G$ inducing a forgetful morphism $H_\mathrm{flat}(X,G)\rightarrow H(X,G)$.

== See also ==
- ∞-Chern–Simons theory

== Literature ==
- Schreiber, Urs (2013-10-29). Differential cohomology in a cohesive ∞-topos (PDF).
- Fiorenza, Domenico; Schreiber, Urs; Stasheff, Jim (2012). "Čech cocycles for differential characteristic classes: An ∞-Lie theoretic construction". Advances in Theoretical and Mathematical Physics. 16: 149–250. arXiv:1011.4735. doi:10.4310/ATMP.2012.v16.n1.a5.
