= Crackpot =

Crackpot or Crackpots may refer to:

- A pejorative for an extremist who espouses pseudoscience and is resistant to reason; there are humorous frameworks for measuring degree of pseudo-scientific thinking, such as the crackpot index.
- Crackpot, North Yorkshire, a village in the United Kingdom and home of Crackpot Cave
- Crackpot Hall, a landmark ruin near Keld, North Yorkshire
- a DC comics character, see Blasters (comics)
- "Crackpot", a 1991 episode of the PBS show Shining Time Station
- Crackpots, a 1983 video game developed and published by Activision

== See also ==
- Crockpot, an unrelated small kitchen appliance for cooking soups and stews
