= Comparison of scrum software =

This page compares software with specific support for the scrum framework. Although the features of some general project management software can be conceptualized around scrum, general project management software is not included on this list unless it has, or a plugin for it has, specific support for scrum.

== General information ==
Software	License	Web-based	Hosted On-Premises	SaaS	Implementation programming languages
Azure Boards	Proprietary	Yes	Yes	Yes	.NET and modern Web frameworks
HeySpace	Proprietary	Yes	No	Yes	JavaScript
Jira	Proprietary	Yes	Yes	Yes	Java
Projektron BCS	Proprietary	Yes	Yes	Yes	Java
Taiga	AGPL-3.0-or-later	Yes	Yes	Yes	Python and JavaScript
Trello	Proprietary	Yes	No	Yes	
Tuleap	GPL-2.0-or-later	Yes	Yes	Yes	PHP and JavaScript

== Sprint features ==
Software	Scrum board	Custom columns	Burndown chart	Sprint goal
Azure Boards	Yes	Yes	Yes	Sprint name
HeySpace	Yes	Yes	No	Sprint description
Jira	Yes	Yes	Yes	Yes
Projektron BCS	Yes	Yes	Yes	No
Taiga	Yes	Yes	Yes	Yes
Trello	Yes	Yes	Via plugin	No
Tuleap	Yes	Yes	Yes	Sprint description

== Story features ==
Software	Reorderable product backlog	Story description	Acceptance criteria	Story points	Planning poker	Planning poker points averaging	Story claiming	Comments on stories	Change tracking
Azure Boards	Yes	Yes	Yes	Yes	Via extension	No	Yes	Yes	Yes
HeySpace	Yes	Yes	Yes	No	No	No	Yes	Yes	Yes
Jira	Yes	Yes	Via custom field	Yes	Via plugin	Via plugin	Yes	Yes	Yes
Projektron BCS	Yes	Yes	Yes	Yes	No	No	Yes	Yes	Yes
Taiga	Yes	Yes	Via custom field	Yes	Via plugin	Via plugin	Yes	Yes	Yes
Trello	Yes	Yes	Yes	Via plugin	Via plugin	Via plugin	Yes	Yes	Yes
Tuleap	Yes	Yes	Yes	Yes	No	No	Yes	Yes	Yes

== Task features ==
Software	Tasks within stories	Task claiming	Multiple people can claim tasks	Separate comments on tasks	Auto-story completion (Note: When all tasks have been marked completed.)
Azure Boards	Yes	Yes	No	Yes	Via extension
HeySpace	Yes	No	Yes	Yes	No
Jira	Yes	Yes	No	Yes	Optional
Projektron BCS	Yes	Yes	Yes	Yes	No
Taiga	Yes	Yes	Yes	Yes	Yes
Trello	Yes	No	No	No	No
Tuleap	Yes	Yes	Yes	Yes	Yes

== Integration features ==
Software	Slack integration	HipChat integration	GitHub integration	Data export
Azure Boards	Yes	Yes		Yes
HeySpace	own built-in feature	own built-in feature		No
Jira	Yes	Yes	Yes	Yes
Projektron BCS	No	No		Yes
Taiga	Yes	No		Yes
Trello	Yes	Yes		Yes
Tuleap	No	No		Yes

== See also ==
- Comparison of project management software
- Kanban (development)
