= ∞-Chern–Simons theory =

Combination of higher category theory with Chern–Simons theory

In mathematics, ∞-Chern–Simons theory (not to be confused with infinite-dimensional Chern–Simons theory) is a generalized formulation of Chern–Simons theory from differential geometry using the formalism of higher category theory, which in particular studies ∞-categories. It is obtained by taking general abstract analogs of all involved concepts defined in any cohesive ∞-topos, for example that of smooth ∞-groupoids. Principal bundles on which Lie groups act are for example replaced by ∞-principal bundles on with group objects in ∞-topoi act. The theory is named after Shiing-Shen Chern and James Simons, who first described Chern–Simons forms in 1974, although the generalization was not developed by them.

== See also ==
- ∞-Chern–Weil theory

== Literature ==
- Fiorenza, Domenico; Schreiber, Urs; Stasheff, Jim (2012). "Čech cocycles for differential characteristic classes: An ∞-Lie theoretic construction". Advances in Theoretical and Mathematical Physics. 16: 149–250. arXiv:1011.4735. doi:10.4310/ATMP.2012.v16.n1.a5.
- Schreiber, Urs (2011-11-16). Chern-Simons terms on higher moduli stacks (PDF). Hausdorff Institute Bonn.
- Schreiber, Urs (2013-10-29). Differential cohomology in a cohesive ∞-topos (PDF).
- Domenico Fiorenza; Hisham Sati; Urs Schreiber (2011-12-07). "A Higher Stacky Perspective on Chern–Simons Theory". Mathematical Aspects of Quantum Field Theories. Mathematical Physics Studies. pp. 153–211. arXiv:1301.2580. doi:10.1007/978-3-319-09949-1_6. ISBN 978-3-319-09948-4.
