= Trello =

Project management software application

- Original authors: Joel Spolsky; Michael Pryor
- Developer: Atlassian
- Release: 13 September 2011; 15 years ago
Stable release
- Android: 2023.13.1.7275 / 22 September 2023; 3 years ago
- iOS: 2023.13.3 / 21 September 2023; 3 years ago
- Operating system: Web application, macOS, Windows OS, iOS 12+, Android 5.1+
- Size: 15.68 MB (Android); 139.7 MB (iOS); 79.15 MB (Windows)
- Available in: 21 languages
- List of languages Czech, Dutch, English, Finnish, French, German, Hungarian, Italian, Japanese, Norwegian, Polish, Portuguese, Russian, Simplified Chinese, Spanish, Swedish, Thai, Traditional Chinese, Turkish, Ukrainian, and Vietnamese
- Type: Productivity software, team collaboration, project management, task management,
- License: Proprietary software
- Website: trello.com

Trello is a web-based, kanban-style list-making application developed by Atlassian. Created in 2011 by Fog Creek Software, it was spun out to form the basis of a separate company in New York City in 2014 and sold to Atlassian in January 2017.

== History ==
The name Trello is derived from the word trellis, which had been a code name for the project at its early stages. Trello was released at a TechCrunch event by Fog Creek founder Joel Spolsky. In September 2011 Wired magazine named the application one of "The 7 Coolest Startups You Haven't Heard of Yet". Lifehacker said "it makes project collaboration simple and kind of enjoyable".

In 2014, it raised US$10.3 million in funding from Index Ventures and Spark Capital. Prior to its acquisition, Trello had sold 22% of its shares to investors, with the remaining shares held by founders Michael Pryor and Joel Spolsky. In May 2016, Trello claimed it had more than 1.1 million daily active users and 14 million total signups.

In May 2015, Trello expanded internationally with localized interfaces for Brazil, Germany, and Spain.

In 2016 Trello launched the Power-Up platform, allowing 3rd party developers to build and distribute extensions known as Power-Ups to Trello. Initial integrations included Zendesk, SurveyMonkey and Giphy. By January 2022 there were a total of 247 power-ups listed in the Power-Up directory.

On 9 January 2017, Atlassian announced its intent to acquire Trello for $425 million. The transaction was made with $360 million in cash and $65 million in shares and options.

In December 2018, Trello announced its acquisition of Butler, a company that developed a leading power-up for automating tasks within a Trello board.

Trello announced 35 million users in March 2019 and 50 million users in October 2019.

In 2020 Craig Jones, then cybersecurity operations director at Sophos, found that the company exposed the personally identifiable information (PII) data of its users, exposed through public Trello boards; the researcher first tweeted about this issue in the year 2018.

On 16 January 2024 Trello suffered a data breach containing over 15 million unique email addresses, names and usernames, when the data was posted on a popular hacking forum. The data was obtained by enumerating a publicly accessible resource using email addresses from previous breach corpuses; it was then added on 22 January 2024 to the famous website collecting data breaches "Have I Been Pwned?".

== Uses ==
Users can create task boards with different columns and move the tasks between them. Typically columns include task statuses such as To Do, In Progress, Done. The tool can be used for personal and business purposes including real estate management, software project management, school bulletin boards, lesson planning, accounting, web design, gaming, and law office case management.

== Architecture ==
According to a Fog Creek blog post in January 2012, the client was a thin web layer which downloads the main app, written in CoffeeScript and compiled to minified JavaScript, using Backbone.js, HTML5 .pushState(), and the Mustache templating language. The server was built on top of MongoDB, Node.js and a modified version of Socket.io.

== See alsoComparison of scrum software ==
- Comparison of project management software
- List of collaborative software
- Tech companies in the New York metropolitan area
