= Architecture astronaut =

Term in software development

In software development, an architecture astronaut is a term for an individual who is focused on abstract ideas underpinning software design. It is often used pejoratively. The concept was popularized by developer Joel Spolsky in his 2001 essay, "Don't let architecture astronauts scare you", in which he criticized their tendency to see patterns in everything as "absurd". Programmer John Carmack has defined architecture astronauts as "a class of programmers or designers who only want to talk about things from the highest level."

An abstract approach to software architecture can help build an understanding of the bigger picture, and the ability to communicate ideas to a broad group of stakeholders can be valuable. However, the architecture astronaut can take this approach to an extreme, and become disconnected from the systems they are designing. While they may impress others initially with their ability to speak confidently and at extremely high levels of abstraction, their actual designs often lack technical depth and practicality. Demonstrating little regard for logistical details about how their ideas should be executed, they may ultimately lose the respect of their development teams. According to Spolsky:

When you go too far up, abstraction-wise, you run out of oxygen. Sometimes, smart thinkers just don't know when to stop, and they create these absurd, all-encompassing, high-level pictures of the universe that are all good and fine, but don't actually mean anything at all.

In 2021, John Carmack, then CTO of Oculus consulting, described the metaverse as "a honeypot trap for architecture astronauts". He lamented that Mark Zuckerberg's focus on building the metaverse could result in thousands of people spending years building things that would not end up being useful.

Other projects that have been characterized as the work of architecture astronauts include XHTML 2.0, which HTML5 evangelist Bruce Lawson described in 2010 as "a beautiful specification of philosophical purity that had absolutely no resemblance to the real world."
