= Stack Exchange =

Network of Q&A sites based in New York City

Stack Exchange Network
- Website type: Knowledge market; Question and answer
- Owner: Prosus N.V.
- Creators: Jeff Atwood; Joel Spolsky
- Website: stackexchange.com
- Commercial: Yes
- Registration: Yes
- Launched: September 2009; 17 years ago (relaunched in January 2011)
- Content license: User contributions under CC BY-SA 2.5, 3.0, and 4.0

Stack Exchange is a network of question-and-answer (Q&A) websites on topics in diverse fields, each site covering a specific topic, where questions, answers, and users are subject to a reputation award process. The reputation system allows the sites to be self-moderating.

All sites in the network are modeled after the initial site Stack Overflow which was created by Jeff Atwood and Joel Spolsky in 2008. Further Q&A sites in the network are established, defined, and eventually – if found relevant – brought to creation by registered users through a special site named Area 51.

User contributions since May 2, 2018 are licensed under Creative Commons Attribution-ShareAlike 4.0 International. Older content, contributed while the site used the Creative Commons Attribution-ShareAlike 3.0 Unported license or the earlier Creative Commons Attribution-ShareAlike 2.5 Unported license, remains licensed under the license in force at the time it was contributed.

In June 2021, Prosus acquired Stack Overflow for US$1.8 billion, its first complete acquisition in the area of educational technology.

== History ==
=== Founding and growth ===
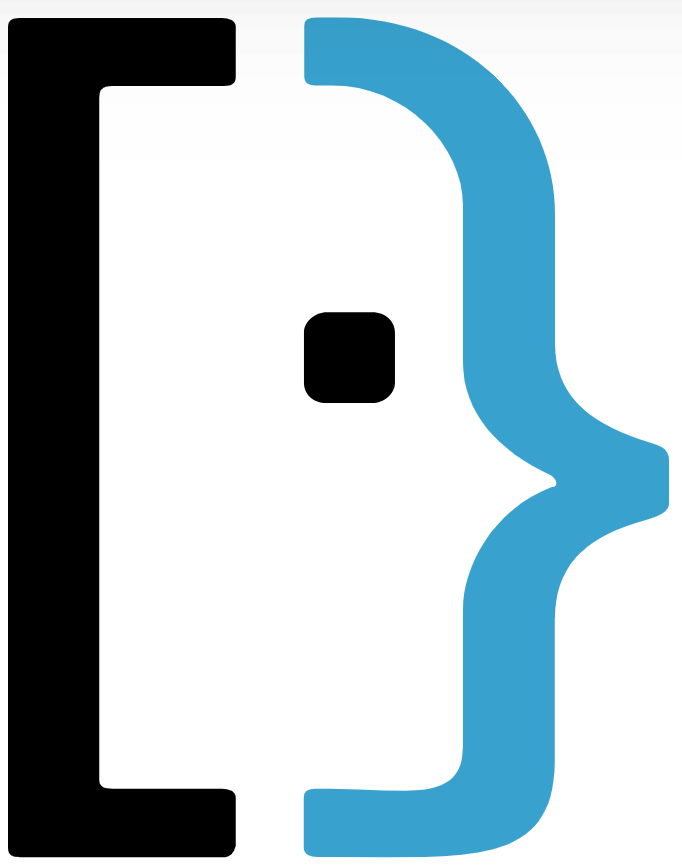
Super User logo

In 2008, Jeff Atwood and Joel Spolsky created Stack Overflow, a question-and-answer website for computer programming questions, which they described as an alternative to the programmer forum Experts-Exchange. In 2009, they started additional sites based on the Stack Overflow model: Server Fault for questions related to system administration and Super User for questions from computer power users.

In September 2009, Spolsky's company, Fog Creek Software, released a beta version of the Stack Exchange 1.0 platform as a way for third parties to create their own communities based on the software behind Stack Overflow, with monthly fees. This white label service was not successful, with few customers and slow growing communities.

In May 2010, Stack Overflow (as its own new company) raised US$6 million in venture capital from Union Square Ventures and other investors, and it switched its focus to developing new sites for answering questions on specific subjects, Stack Exchange 2.0. Users vote on new site topics in a staging area called Area 51, where algorithms determine which suggested site topics have critical mass and should be created. In November 2010, Stack Exchange site topics in "beta testing" included physics, mathematics, and writing. Stack Exchange publicly launched in January 2011 with 33 Web sites; it had 27 employees and 1.5 million users at the time, and it included advertising. At that time, it was compared to Quora, founded in 2009, which similarly specializes in expert answers. Other competing sites include WikiAnswers and Yahoo! Answers.

In February 2011, Stack Overflow released an associated job board called Careers 2.0, charging fees to recruiters for access, which later re-branded to Stack Overflow Careers. In March 2011, Stack Overflow raised US$12 million in additional venture funding, and the company renamed itself to Stack Exchange, Inc. It is based in Manhattan. In February 2012, Atwood left the company.

On April 18, 2013 CipherCloud issued Digital Millennium Copyright Act (DMCA) takedown notices in an attempt to block discussion of possible weaknesses of their encryption algorithm. The Stack Exchange Crypto group discussion on the algorithm was censored, but it was later restored without pictures.

As of September 2015, "Stack Exchange" no longer refers to the company, only the network of question-and-answer websites. Instead, the company is now referred to as Stack Overflow.

In 2016, Stack Exchange added a variety of new sites which pushed the boundaries of the typical question-and-answer site. For example, Puzzling offers a platform for users who already know the answer to questions to challenge their peers to solve the problems unlike traditional Q–A sites where the poster does not know the answer.

=== Declining relationship between users and company ===
In 2016, Stack Exchange announced the second iteration of the Stack Exchange Quality Project, in which they attempt to implement specific important features requested by the community to meet a distinct high-priority set of goals. After users enthusiastically responded with feature ideas, they complained that there was insufficient action on the company's part.

In October 2018, the company removed its Interpersonal Skills site from the Hot Network Questions list after a complaint on Twitter, and an employee (who was part of the SRE team, which was not community-facing) posted tweets attacking moderators.

==== Late 2019 controversies ====
To start, in June 2019, more advertisements were added causing a large dispute. On September 27, 2019, a moderator of multiple Stack Exchange sites, specifically Monica Cellio, was dismissed from her moderator position, allegedly connected to behavior associated with upcoming changes to the Code of Conduct (CoC) relating to gender pronouns. Many other moderators resigned or suspended their moderator activity in response to the dismissal. The company responded with two very poorly received messages which have since been deleted, and by a slightly less negatively-received apology several days later. In December 2019, the company posted a message, stating that they and the moderator had come to an agreement and expressing regret for any damage to her reputation. Nevertheless, this, plus the sudden departure of multiple community managers (Stack Exchange employees who interact with the community), led to an erosion of trust between the community and the company—convincing many of the site's most prolific users, including many community-elected moderators and a community manager, to depart within the next few months.

==== 2019–2020 licensing change announcements ====
On September 2, 2019, the terms of service (and the footer of every page served) changed to referencing the "Creative Commons Attribution-ShareAlike" (CC BY-SA) license's 4.0 version instead of its 3.0 version. Users were puzzled as to how Stack Overflow acquired the rights for this relicensing of their past contributions, with some users explicitly stating that they did not intend their contributions to be licensed under CC BY-SA 4.0. Users were concerned that, if the relicensing was found to be a breach of CC BY-SA 3.0, Stack Exchange would have made itself unable to distribute the content under any CC BY-SA license (and that the footer's license statement could be erroneous), and would have to rely on its "perpetual and irrevocable right and license to use, copy, cache, publish, display, distribute, modify, create derivative works and store" the content instead. On September 27, an official Stack Exchange reply stated it had been an "important step", but declined to discuss with the community the legal basis for the relicensing.

In March 2020, a post announced that content contributed before May 2, 2018 was available under a CC BY-SA 3.0 license. In the ensuing discussion, several users asked about the similar situation in August 2010, when Stack Exchange switched from accepting CC BY-SA 2.5 contributions to 3.0. A representative of the corporation noted "we are looking [...] to show v2.5 for posts predating this change but cannot commit to it yet". Some users were unconvinced that the September 2019 announcement was not a breach of CC BY-SA 3.0 that would have caused its termination, and some answers were not placated by the dateline chosen. In the ensuing discussion, Stack Overflow staff declined to comment.

==== June–August 2023 moderation strike ====
In mid-2023, Stack Exchange made several changes regarding its policies around content generated by artificial intelligence which resulted in a strike of a portion of its volunteer moderators. The protest centered around a policy posted to moderators on May 29 stating that the use of AI-detection tools was not permitted as part of moderation. In a statement, Stack Exchange confirmed that 11% of moderators had ceased content moderation in response to this policy. This would grow to more than 23% of all moderators on the network by June 22, including more than 70% of all Stack Overflow moderators.

The strike began with a post to Meta Stack Exchange, which raised concerns regarding the quality and accuracy of AI-generated content, and the lack of transparency from Stack Exchange surrounding this policy change. Moderators also stated that the version of the policy released to the public differed from the version they had received on the moderator-only forum, notably in that the public version did not include language requiring that moderators stop restricting all AI content.

Negotiations between Stack Exchange and moderators resulted in new policies allowing moderators to remove AI content when there is a strong indicator of GPT usage, and a commitment from the site to continue to provide data and API access. At the conclusion of negotiations, the strike ended on August 2, 2023.

=== Drastic drop in number of questions asked, 2020-2026 ===
The years 2017-2026 saw a drop in the number of questions asked on the site, with the drop becoming especially precipitous around 2023. The figure for March 2026 was down by 96% compared to March 2017. Discussion has focused on this metric because it is publicly available, but there is no public information on statistics such as total page views or advertising revenue. In discussion on meta.stackexchange.com, there was a lack of consensus on whether this was in fact a bad thing or what was causing the change. Users speculated that SE "had various incidents over time that caused core users to leave," or that over time, 'the "repository of information" fills up [because] effectively all the "good questions" have been asked many times over already,' or that Q&A activity has shifted to large language models.

== Site features ==
=== Reputation and badges ===
The primary purpose of each Stack Exchange site is to enable users to post questions and answer them. Users can vote on both answers and questions, and through this process users earn reputation points, a form of gamification. This voting system was compared to Digg when the Stack Exchange platform was first released. Users receive privileges by collecting reputation points, ranging from the ability to vote and comment on questions and answers to the ability to moderate many aspects of the site. Due to the prominence of Stack Exchange profiles in web search results and the Stack Overflow Careers job board, users may have reason to game the system. Along with posting questions and answers, users can add comments to them and edit text written by others. Each Stack Exchange site has a "meta" section where users can settle disputes, in the style of MetaFilter's "MetaTalk" forum, because the self-moderation system for questions and answers can lead to significant arguments.

Badges are awarded for asking and answering, participating in meta, and for moderating the site. There are bronze, silver and gold badges and appear on users' profile pages as well as their posts.

=== Moderators and election process ===
Moderators are responsible for managing the site, such as by following up on flagged posts, locking and protecting posts, suspending users, and deleting the worst posts (including misinformation) on the site. According to the Stack Exchange philosophy, they should be minimally involved in the site. They are also expected to lead by example, as well as to show respect to other users.

To become a moderator, users have to participate in an election. Elections are called as needed by the Stack Exchange Community Team for a designated number of seats. Users must first nominate themselves and have at least 300 reputation (3,000 on Stack Overflow and 1,000 on Math Stack Exchange), while also being in good standing, such as not having been suspended during the past year. Aside from introducing themselves and explaining why they would be a good moderator, users must also answer questions written by the community. Nominations can be withdrawn at any time.

After this, users vote on the candidates in a primary, where the vote tally is made public. The top 10 nominees advance to the election stage, where any user with at least 150 reputation is allowed to vote. A ranked-choice voting system is used where users can rank all the candidates if they wish. Votes are tallied using the Meek STV method (single transferable vote) which allows fractional parts of a vote to be counted.

=== Bounties ===
Stack Exchange allows users to donate some of their reputation to help questions receive answers or better answers, as well as to incentivize users to answer. This is called a 'bounty' and can be applied on questions 48 hours after being asked, lasting for 7 days plus a grace period of 24 hours. The minimum bounty is set at 50 reputation, except if the user has already answered the question or has offered a previous bounty on the question. Bounties cannot be cancelled, and reputation cannot be refunded from a bounty, even if the question did not receive an answer.

== Technologies used ==
Stack Exchange uses IIS, SQL Server, and the ASP.NET framework, all from a single code base for every Stack Exchange site (except Area 51, which runs off a fork of the Stack Overflow code base). Blogs formerly used WordPress, but they have been discontinued. The team also uses Redis, HAProxy and Elasticsearch.

Stack Exchange tries to stay up to date with the newest technologies from Microsoft, usually using the latest releases of any given framework. The code is primarily written in C# ASP.NET MVC using the Razor View Engine. The preferred IDE is Visual Studio and the data layers uses Dapper for data access.

The site makes use of URL slugs in addition to numeric identifiers for question URLs.

== Site creation process ==
Every new site created in the Stack Exchange Network goes through a detailed review process on a site called Area 51, that consists of four steps:

- Definition: A public proposal must be drafted and posted so that any member of the community can discuss the proposal and vote on it. This allows a collaborative proposal to emerge over time. The proposal must address these four key issues
  1. the topic of the site
  2. the targeted audience
  3. forty exemplary questions, upvoted at least 10 times from the community
  4. 60 followers from the community
- Commitment: First, 200 users interested in the new site are asked to formally commit and support the site by actively participating and contributing to it by asking or answering 10 questions during the FIRDR six months of the public beta. Second, 100 users interested in the new site that have committed with over 200 reputation on another site on the network. Finally, it requires a commitment score of 500, which uses the following formula:
  1. PrelimScore = SUM(Reputation >= 200 ? 0.233 * ln(Reputation-101) - 0.75 : 0) + 1.5
  2. UserScore = PrelimScore * 0.9 ^ (DAYS / 180)
- Beta: A live test version of this site is tested out, in two steps.
  1. Private Beta: If the concept receives 100% commitment (reaches the requirements listed above), the site enters the private beta phase, where committed members begin actively using the site and publicizing it. It must remain for at least 35 days (or 5 weeks).
  2. Public Beta: The site is open to the public for a long period. This allows the creators to ensure that the site reaches critical mass before it is fully launched. It much remain for at least 180 days (or 6 months) of public beta, and 215 total days of beta (31 weeks).
- Graduation: If the site has at least 1000 open questions, and 70% of questions or more have at least 1 upvoted answer, it is granted a "graduation" and fully launched.

== Notable users ==
=== Nobel Prize winners ===
- Gerard 't Hooft

=== Fields Medal winners ===
- Peter Scholze (2018)
- Martin Hairer (2014)
- Terence Tao (2006)
- Tim Gowers (1998)
- Curtis McMullen (1998)
- Richard Borcherds (1998)
- Edward Witten (1990)
- Vaughan Jones (1990)
- Michael Freedman (1986)
- William Thurston (1982)

=== Founders ===
- Joel Spolsky (co-founder of Stack Overflow)
- Jeff Atwood (co-founder of Stack Overflow)
- Ravi Vakil (co-founder of MathOverflow)

=== Other notable scientists and mathematicians ===
- Scott Aaronson
- Ian Agol
- John Baez
- Carlo Beenakker
- Andreas Blass
- Robert Bryant
- Cleo
- Noam Elkies
- Matthew Emerton
- David Eppstein (inventor of Eppstein's algorithm)
- Alexandre Eremenko
- Joel David Hamkins (top user on MathOverflow)
- James E. Humphreys
- Gil Kalai
- Anna Krylov
- Greg Kuperberg
- Tim Peters (software engineer) (inventor of Timsort)
- Joseph O'Rourke
- Igor Rivin
- Guido van Rossum (creator of Python)
- Anders Sandberg
- Jeffrey Shallit (computer scientist with Erdos number of one)
- Peter Shor (inventor of Shor's algorithm)
- Michael Shulman
- Nassim Nicholas Taleb

== See also ==
- MathOverflow
- Minimal reproducible example
- PhysicsOverflow
- Q&A software
- Quora
