= Aardvark'd: 12 Weeks with Geeks =

- Film poster
- Directed by: Lerone D. Wilson
- Release date: November 7, 2005
- Running time: 80 minutes
- Country: United States
- Language: English

Aardvark'd: 12 Weeks with Geeks is a 2005 documentary film about the development of Fog Creek Copilot, a remote assistance software tool. Conceptualization of the film began when Fog Creek Software CEO Joel Spolsky announced on his blog that he was seeking a filmmaker to document the development of the product, then called Project Aardvark.

On May 3, 2005, it was announced that Lerone D. Wilson of Boondoggle Films would direct the film, and principal photography commenced shortly afterward. The film was released November 7, 2005 on DVD, and sold over 2,500 copies within the first few days of release. Later, Aardvark'd became a launch title for Google Videos Google Video Store paid download service. It is now also available on YouTube.

== Principal cast ==
- Joel Spolsky
- Dan Bricklin
- Paul Graham
- Steve Huffman
- Alexis Ohanian
- Aaron Swartz
- Benjamin Pollack
- Yaron Guez
- Tyler Griffin Hicks-Wright
- Michael Lehenbauer

== Reception ==
Aardvark'd received mixed reviews from the tech press, the most consistent criticism being that the film didn't delve deep enough into the "nuts and bolts" of programming and software design.
