= Centre for Freudian Analysis and Research =

English research centre

CFAR: Centre for Freudian Analysis and Research
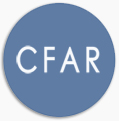
- Founded: 1985
- Type: Charitable organisation
- Registration no.: England and Wales: 1085368
- Purpose: Psychoanalysis; Sigmund Freud; Jacques Lacan
- Location: Suite 56, 571 Finchley Road, London, NW3 7BN United Kingdom
- Members: 41
- Revenue: £96,112 (2009/10)
- Website: Centre for Freudian Analysis and Research

Centre for Freudian Analysis and Research (CFAR) is a psychoanalysis research, training and low-cost treatment centre located in London, United Kingdom. CFAR is a member organisation of the United Kingdom Council for Psychotherapy. CFAR operates within the psychoanalytic tradition of Sigmund Freud and Jacques Lacan.

== History ==
The centre was founded in 1985 by Bice Benvenuto, Professor Bernard Burgoyne, Richard Klein and Darian Leader. It was established as a charity with the purpose of advancing education for the benefit of the public in particular by the provision of training and seminars in psychoanalysis.

== Courses ==
CFAR offers introductory and advanced courses in psychoanalysis, and trains psychoanalysts within the context of its clinical training programme. Seminars are given by visiting Lacanian analysts from France, Belgium, Spain and Australia.

== Publications ==
The Centre publishes a Journal JCFAR which contains articles on psychoanalytic themes from a Freudian and Lacanian perspective. In association with Karnac Books CFAR has published The Centre for Freudian Analysis and Research Library which aims to make classic Lacanian texts available in English for the first time, as well as publishing original research in the Lacanian field:

- Sexual Ambiguities by Geneviève Morel
- The Trainings of the Psychoanalyst by Annie Tardits
- Freud and the Desire of the Psychoanalyst by Serge Cottet
- Lacan and Levi-Strauss or The Return to Freud (1951–1957) by Markos Zafiropoulos

== Challenge to Health Professions Council ==
In February 2007, the UK Government published a white paper (‘Trust, Assurance and Safety – The Regulation of Health Professionals in the 21st Century’) which stated that "The government is planning to introduce statutory regulation for…psychotherapists and counsellors…" and that "…psychotherapists and counsellors will be regulated by the Health Professions Council, following that Council’s rigorous process of assessing their regulatory needs and ensuring that its system is capable of accommodating them".

As a response to this proposed regulation by the Health Professions Council (HPC), CFAR was one of the organisations that contributed to the Maresfield report which opposed the suitability of the HPC as a regulating body for the professions of counselling and psychotherapy in the UK.

Following on from this report, CFAR was one of six organisations that called for a judicial review of whether or not the HPC had, in fact, fully assessed the regulatory needs of the professions or properly determined if it was the most appropriate body to provide such regulation. On Friday 10 December 2010, a Judicial Review Permission Hearing under The Hon. Mr Justice Burton at the Royal Courts of Justice found against the Health Professions Council and granted permission to proceed towards a Judicial Review of the proposals for regulation under the HPC. On 16 February 2011 the UK government — in its command paper ‘Enabling Excellence’ — halted the project to regulate counselling, psychotherapy and other talking treatments via the HPC.

== See also ==
- Mental health in the United Kingdom
