= Askbot =

- Initial release: 2011; 14 years ago
- Stable release: 0.7.53.1 / 22 April 2015; 9 years ago
- Repository: github.com/ASKBOT/askbot-devel
- Written in: Python (Django)
- Type: Web-based Q&A system
- License: GPL3 or later
- Website: askbot.com

Askbot is open source software used to create question and answer oriented Internet forums. The site started in July 2009, initially similar to Stack Overflow or Yahoo! Answers. Based on CNPROG and some code written for OSQA, it is primarily developed and maintained by Evgeny Fadeev.

Websites use Askbot to run their Q&A sites. Askbot can be easily installed by using the documentation on Ubuntu and CentOS.

The Document Foundation put some funds in AskBot development. and LibreOffice used Askbot for Q&A but they decided to migrate to Discourse, as Fedora had done before with its Q&A.

== See also ==
- Q&A software
