= Darian Leader =

British psychoanalyst and author (born 1965)

- Born: 1965 (age 60–61); Alameda County, California
- Education: St Paul's School, London
- Alma mater: Downing College, Cambridge; Paris VIII
- Occupations: Psychoanalyst and author
- Writing career
- Notable awards: Trustee of the Freud Museum; Honorary Visiting Professor in Psychoanalysis at Roehampton University
- Literary movement: Lacanianism

Darian Leader (born 1965) is a British psychoanalyst and author.

== Biography ==
Leader was educated at St Paul's School in London, studied philosophy at Downing College, Cambridge and then he earned an M.A. in history of science in Paris (at Paris VIII), where he also trained as an analyst. He is a founding member of the Centre for Freudian Analysis and Research (CFAR).

Darian Leader was president of the College of Psychoanalysts, a trustee of the Freud Museum, and honorary visiting professor in psychoanalysis at Roehampton University. In 2015 he received the Mercier Chair at the University of Louvain for his work in psychoanalysis.

== Works ==
- Lacan for Beginners, 1995, later editions with a changed title: Introducing Lacan (2000, 2005)
- Why Do Women Write More Letters Than they Post?, 1996
- Promises Lovers Make When It Gets Late, 1997
- Freud's Footnotes, 2000
- Stealing the Mona Lisa: What Art Stops Us from Seeing, 2002
- Why Do People Get Ill? Exploring the Mind-Body-Connection (with David Corfield), 2007
- The New Black. Mourning, Melancholia and Depression, 2008
- What Is Madness?, 2011
- Strictly Bipolar, 2013
- Hands: What We Do With Them – and Why, 2016
- Why Can't We Sleep?, 2019
- Jouissance: Sexuality, Suffering and Satisfaction. 2021
- Is It Ever Just Sex? 2024

A list of journal articles can be found here.
