= Lisa Raphals =

American academic (born 1951)

- Born: May 15, 1951 (age 75)
- Spouse: John C. Baez

Academic work
- Discipline: Chinese Literature, Comparative Literature, Philosophy
- Sub-discipline: Ancient Chinese Studies, Ancient Greek Studies
- Institutions: University of California; Riverside; National University of Singapore
- Main interests: Early China, Ancient Greece and comparative Philosophy

Lisa Ann Raphals (born May 15, 1951) is an American professor of Chinese and comparative literature at the University of California, Riverside (UCR), and of philosophy at the National University of Singapore. She compares early China and ancient Greece. She is the author of a number of books, including Knowing Words: Wisdom and Cunning in the Classical Traditions of China and Greece and Sharing the Light: Representations of Women and Virtue in Early China, as well as a collection of poems and translations entitled What Country.

Raphals is married to John C. Baez, who is a professor of mathematics at UCR.

== Selected works ==
- ——— (1992). Knowing Words: Wisdom and Cunning in the Classical Traditions of China and Greece. Cornell University Press. ISBN 978-0801426193.
- ——— (1994). What Country. North and South. ISBN 978-1870314244.
- ——— (1998). Sharing the Light: Representations of Women and Virtue in Early China. State University of New York Press. ISBN 978-0585059457.
- ——— (2013). Divination and Prediction in Early China and Ancient Greece. Cambridge University Press. ISBN 9781107010758.
- ———; Poo, Mu-chou; Drake, Harold Allen (2017). Old Society, New Belief: Religious Transformation of China and Rome, Ca. 1st-6th Centuries. Oxford University Press. ISBN 9780190278373. OCLC 951754430.
- * ——— (Winter 2020), "Chinese Philosophy and Chinese Medicine", in Zalta, Edward N. (ed.), The {Stanford} Encyclopedia of Philosophy, Metaphysics Research Lab, Stanford University
