= Qhub =

Australian software company

Qhub.com
- Founded: 2004
- Headquarters: Australia
- Services: Q&A Software
- Website: Qhub.com

Qhub.com is an Australian-based company, which provides Q&A software. The company was originally set up in 2004 in the UK by Christopher Lee and Tim O’Shea. The company was later sold to an Australian entrepreneur named Robert Millar in 2012. After the transaction was completed, the company’s headquarters were moved from the UK and are now based in Australia.

Qhub has over 6000 active customer licenses and is used by tens of thousands of web users daily. Their customer base is varied and includes businesses, clubs and social groups. In 2010, Inspired Magazine rated the company as the number 1 Q&A website resource.

The company predominantly focused on the UK and US markets until 2013, when the company expanded its operations to Japan.

== History ==
The website was launched in 2004 to offer a Q&A web solution. Tim O’Shea and Christopher Lee, who also founded Blurtit, created Qhub. After founding the company Lee wrote, “We believe the Q&A format is at its most useful when built around a niche with owners and members who are really passionate about their subject.”

After the foundation, a number of large websites began to implement the Q&A solution into their sites. In 2010, Inspired Magazine rated the company as the number 1 Q&A website resource globally.

After 8 years of ownership and guidance under Lee and O’Shea, the company was sold in 2012. The new owner and CEO of the company is Robert Millar, an Australian-based entrepreneur. Millar was previously known as the founder and CEO of successful IT outsourcing and recruiting firm Zeros And Ones Japan Limited in Kawasaki City, which he sold to India's Simplex Solutions in 2007.

After Millar purchased Qhub, he concentrated on expanding the business and its global reach. This began in 2013, when Millar expanded the company operations to Japan.

== Mechanics ==
In general, Qhub resembles a number of Q&A sites, but with a few differences. One of the main features is Qhub lets the user choose between a public, or private community. It can be used by anyone to create their own customized Q&A site to handle visitor questions and answers. Many companies have utilized this as the corporate environment in their FAQ section. Another major feature is that the Qhub platform can be integrated into existing sites, meaning the cost of implementation remains low.

Widgets can also be used, and can plug directly into an existing website. While the site and platform is predominantly aimed at users looking for a Q&A solution, it has also been used as a basic blogging platform.

The platform does allow users to charge a fee for the answers they provide. Qhub is also a multi-device system, meaning it can be used on PCs and also tablet computers and smartphones.
