= Zhihu =

Chinese question-and-answer forum website

Zhihu Inc.
- Company type: Public
- Website type: Knowledge markets, Q&A software
- Available in: Chinese
- Traded as: NYSE: ZH; SEHK: 2390
- Headquarters: Beijing, China
- Area served: Worldwide
- Founders: Zhou Yuan (周源); Li Shenshen (李申申); Huang Jixin (黄继新)
- Key people: Zhou Yuan (CEO)
- Revenue: ▼CN¥3.599 billion (2024)
- Website: www.zhihu.com
- Launched: January 2011; 15 years ago
- Current status: Active

Zhihu
- Chinese: 知乎
- Literal meaning: Do you know
Transcriptions
Standard Mandarin
- Hanyu Pinyin: Zhīhū
- Bopomofo: ㄓ ㄏㄨ
- IPA: [ʈʂɻ̩́.xú]
Yue: Cantonese
- Jyutping: zi^{1} fu^{4}

Zhihu (Chinese: 知乎; pinyin: Zhīhū) is a Chinese social question and answer site and news aggregator. Originally based in Chengdu and with creators from Sichuan, the website launched on January 26, 2011. As of 2021 it has 76 million registered users. It has often been compared to Quora, though by the early 2020s it has also acquired Reddit-like features.

== History ==
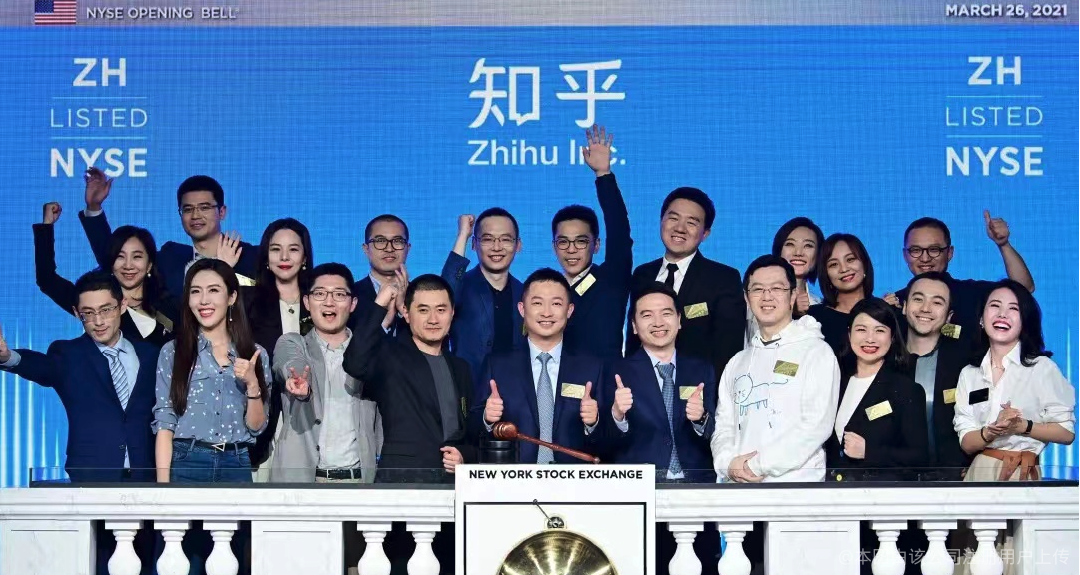
Zhihu IPO day at NYSE

Zhihu began development in August 2010. It went through a closed beta test at the end of December 2010. The final product went online on January 26, 2011. It has reportedly received funding from Kai-Fu Lee's Innovation Works, Qiming Ventures, SAIF Partners, Tencent, and Sogou.

In October 2011, Zhihu completed its A-round of funding for US$7 million from Innovation Works and Qiming Ventures. In 2015, Zhihu completed its C-round of funding for US$55 million.

In 2017, Zhihu officially commercialized. In August 2018, Zhihu completed its E-round of funding, raising US$270 million for a total company valuation at US$2.5 billion. On August 12, 2019, Zhihu completed a subsequent F-round of funding led by Chinese short video platform Kuaishou and technology company Baidu, garnering US$450 million. As a result, Baidu mobile app searches would directly return Zhihu content.

The number of registered users on Zhihu exceeded 10 million by the end of 2013, and reached 17 million as of May 2015, with 250 million monthly page views.

On March 2, 2018, the Cyberspace Administration of China required all app stores to remove Zhihu for 7 days for the alleged presence of illegal content and insufficient monitoring. On the same day, Android app stores removed Zhihu. On the Apple App Store, Zhihu became unavailable for download.

On October 9, 2020, a video creation tool was launched on Zhihu. The tool is able to suggest images and generate voice over for text. The tool reduces the technical barrier to video creation on the platform.

In December 2021, ten of Zhihu's shareholders, including Sogou and Tencent's investment arm, sold all of their stakes (78% ownership) in Beijing Zhizhe Tianxia Technology, the parent company of Zhihu. All shares were transferred to the founder and CEO, Zhou Yuan (Chinese: 周源; pinyin: Zhōu Yuán), who owned more than 99% of the company thereafter. This occurred three days after regulatory pressures from the Beijing branch of the Cyberspace Administration of China (CAC), during which Zhihu was instructed to rectify practices that had led to unlawful release of information. Zhihu's initial public offering on the New York Stock Exchange came on March 26, 2021. Zhihu started trading on the Hong Kong Stock Exchange on April 11, 2022.

In July 2023, Zhihu no longer supported anonymous posting, although anonymous content is also under the monitoring of Zhihu. Previously published posts were not affected. In 2023, Zhuhu launched the "Yanyan Stories" stories feature, where short stories posted by Zhihu users were adapted into novels, with some of these adapted into movies and television shows. In October 2025, at the Frankfurt Book Fair in Germany, Zhihu unveiled the Yanyan Story Platform internationally. Content on the platform includes books, digital reading, audio dramas, and cultural products. Some literary works on the platform are available in multiple languages, including English, Indonesian, Spanish, Korean, Japanese, Portuguese, and Thai. At the time, over 100 works had been licensed for domestic or international publication.

On June 29, 2024, Zhihu launched Zhida, an AI search product.

== Product ==
Zhihu functions similarly to Quora, to the point where it where has been describe as a "clone" of that website. Users may submit questions and answers, as well as upvote the best answer. Questions answers follow a power law distribution, with most questions receiving few answers and a small minority getting many answers. Answers to questions tend to come from a large pool of infrequently active users, rather than a small pool of highly active users.

Initially, Zhihu sought to appeal to an elite expert audience, featuring expert panels and daily and weekly newsletters. Originally user registration was primarily invitation-only, with referrals needed from a couple hundred registered users. Otherwise, new users had to apply to join by filling in a large amount of personal information and waiting for a reply. By the early 2020s, Zhihu had sought to move away from an expert answer model towards favouring mass audience participation.

=== Trending & live ===
Trending is a leaderboard where popular topics are ranked by engagement metrics, including likes, shares, and impressions. Live is where users, including individuals and organizations, can host live streams. Live streams in Zhihu can be set to unpaid or paid. In a paid live stream, participants are required to pay a fee to watch.

=== Zhida ===
Zhida is a large language model search and answer product. The meaning of its name is "direct answer" in Mandarin. It can integrate answers in content archive on platform with external links. It is intended to improve the user experience in asking, searching, generating results, and summarizing. Both service entry points and an independent domain are offered. Users can search by content or by contributor, and between brief or in-depth for the generation of answers.

== See also ==
- List of question-and-answer websites
