= Alissa Crans =

American mathematician

Alissa Susan Crans
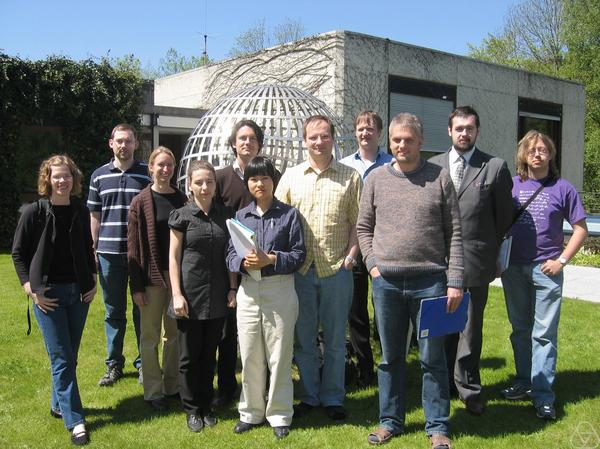
- Alissa Crans (3rd from left) at the 2008 MFO workshop Invariants in Low-Dimensional Topology
- Education: University of Redlands
- Scientific career
- Fields: Mathematics
- Workplaces: Pomona College; Loyola Marymount University

Alissa Susan Crans is an American mathematician specializing in higher-dimensional algebra. She is a professor of mathematics at Loyola Marymount University, and the associate director of Project NExT, a program of the Mathematical Association of America to mentor post-doctoral mathematicians, statisticians, and mathematics teachers.

== Education and career ==
Crans graduated summa cum laude and Phi Beta Kappa from the University of Redlands in 1999. She earned an M.S. and Ph.D. from the University of California, Riverside in 2000 and 2004 respectively. Her dissertation, Lie 2-Algebras, was supervised by John C. Baez.

She worked as a lecturer at Pomona College in 2002, as VIGRE Ross Assistant Professor at Ohio State University from 2005 to 2006, and as Visiting Dickson Instructor at the University of Chicago in 2008. Meanwhile she started as an assistant professor at Loyola Marymount University in 2004, and was promoted to full professor there in 2016, with another leave to work as Associate Director of Diversity and Education at the Mathematical Sciences Research Institute from 2012 to 2014.

She took up her position as associate director of Project NExT in 2014. She is also active as a mentor for women in mathematics, and served as member-at-large on the executive committee of the Association for Women in Mathematics from 2014 to 2018.

== Recognition ==
Diamond Bar High School lists Crans among their Distinguished Alumni. In 2011 the Mathematical Association of America (MAA) gave Crans their Henry L. Alder Award for Distinguished Teaching by a Beginning College/University Mathematics Faculty Member. In the same year she also won the Merten M. Hasse Prize of the MAA for her paper "Musical Actions of Dihedral Groups". She was an MAA Distinguished Lecturer in 2014, speaking about the Catalan numbers. The Association for Women in Mathematics has included her in the 2020 class of AWM Fellows for "mentoring and supporting women at Loyola Marymount and through EDGE, SMP, SPWM, and Project NExT; for her role in the Pacific Coast Undergraduate Mathematics Conference, recognized as an AMS Program That Makes a Difference". She is included in a deck of playing cards featuring notable women mathematicians published by the Association of Women in Mathematics.
