= Instiki =

Instiki is a wiki software written in Ruby on Rails, created by David Heinemeier Hansson and maintained by physicist Jacques Distler. Instiki is free software under the Ruby license.

== Features ==
Instiki includes a LaTeX plugin.

== Notable users ==
A custom fork of it is run on the nLab mathematics wiki.
