= David Corfield =

British philosopher

- Born: David Neil Corfield

Education
- Education: University of Cambridge (BA); King's College London (MSc; PhD, 1996)
- Thesis: Research Programmes, Logic, and Analogy: Three Aspects of Mathematics and Its Development (1996)
- Doctoral advisor: Donald A. Gillies

Philosophical work
- Era: Contemporary philosophy
- Region: Western philosophy
- School: Analytic
- Institutions: University of Kent; Charles University
- Main interests: Philosophy of mathematics Philosophy of psychology
- Notable ideas: List: Philosophy of real mathematics (as opposed to metamathematics) Adoption of mathematical-categorification procedures for philosophy Homotopy type theory as an inherently structuralist foundational language for mathematics Modal homotopy type theory Criticism of the foundationalist filter

David Neil Corfield is a British philosopher specializing in philosophy of mathematics and philosophy of psychology. He was a senior lecturer of philosophy at the University of Kent until 2024.

== Education ==
Corfield studied mathematics at the University of Cambridge, and later earned his MSc and PhD in the philosophy of science and mathematics at King's College London. His doctoral advisor was Donald A. Gillies.

== Work ==
Corfield is the author of Towards a Philosophy of Real Mathematics (2003), in which he argues that the philosophical implications of mathematics did not stop with Gödel's incompleteness theorems. He has also co-authored a book with Darian Leader about psychology and psychosomatic medicine, Why Do People Get Ill? (2007).

He joined the University of Kent in 2007 and became senior lecturer in philosophy in 2010, remaining in that position until July 2024. He served on the steering committee of nLab, a collaborative wiki devoted to mathematics, physics, and philosophy. The committee ceased operating in June 2026.

In September 2026, he joined the Department of Distributed and Dependable Systems at the Faculty of Mathematics and Physics of Charles University in Prague as a researcher.

== Bibliography ==
- "Assaying Lakatos's Philosophy of Mathematics", Studies in History and Philosophy of Science 28(1), 99–121 (1997).
- "Beyond the Methodology of Mathematical Research Programmes", Philosophia Mathematica 6, 272–301 (1998).
- "Come the Revolution...", critical notice on The Principles of Mathematics Revisited by Jaakko Hintikka, Philosophical Books 39(3), 150–6 (1998).
- "The Importance of Mathematical Conceptualisation", Studies in History and Philosophy of Science 32(3), 507–533 (2001).
- "Bayesianism in Mathematics", in Corfield D. and Williamson J. (eds.) (2001), 175–201.
- (with J. Williamson), "Bayesianism into the 21st Century", in Corfield D. and Williamson J. (eds.) (2001), 1–16.
- Corfield D. and Williamson J. (eds.), Foundations of Bayesianism, Kluwer Applied Logic Series (2001).
- "Argumentation and the Mathematical Process", G. Kampis, L. Kvasz & M. Stöltzner (eds.) Appraising Lakatos: Mathematics, Methodology, and the Man, 115–138. Kluwer, Dordrecht (2002).
- Review of Conceptual Mathematics by F. W. Lawvere and S. Schanuel and A Primer of Infinitesimal Analysis by J. Bell, Studies in History and Philosophy of Modern Physics, 33B(2), 359–366 (2002).
- "From Mathematics to Psychology: Lacan's Missed Encounters" in J. Glynos and Y. Stavrakakis (eds.), Lacan and Science, Karnac Books, 179–206 (2002).
- Towards a Philosophy of Real Mathematics, Cambridge University Press (2003).
- Review of Opening Skinner's Box by Lauren Slater, The Guardian, 27 March 2004.
- Review of Krieger, M. (2005). "Doing Mathematics". Philosophia Mathematica. 13: 106–111.
- "Categorification as a Heuristic Device", in D. Gillies and C. Cellucci (eds.), Mathematical Reasoning and Heuristics, King's College Publications (2005).
- "Some Implications of the Adoption of Category Theory for Philosophy", in Giandomenico Sica (ed.), What is Category Theory?, Polimetrica (2006), 75–94.
- (with Darian Leader) Why Do People Get Ill?, Hamish Hamilton (2007).
- Corfield, David (2011). "Understanding the Infinite II: Coalgebra". Studies in History and Philosophy of Science. 42 (4): 571–579. Bibcode:2011SHPSA..42..571C. doi:10.1016/j.shpsa.2011.09.013.
- Modal Homotopy Type Theory: The Prospect of a New Logic for Philosophy, Oxford University Press (2020).
