= Taiga (project management) =

Open-source project management system

- Developers: Taiga Agile, LLC
- Release: October 7, 2014; 11 years ago
- Stable release: 6.10.1 / May 6, 2026; 53 days ago
- Written in: Python, Django, AngularJS
- Type: Project management system
- License: AGPL-3.0-or-later
- Website: taiga.io
- Repository: github.com/taigaio

Taiga is a free and open-source project management system for startups, agile developers, and designers. Its frontend is written in AngularJS and CoffeeScript; backend, in Django and Python. Taiga is released under the AGPL-3.0-or-later license.

== Overview ==
Taiga is a project management application that can handle both simple and complex projects for startups, software developers, and other target teams. It tracks the progress of a project. With Taiga, you can use either Kanban or Scrum template, or both. Backlogs are shown as a running list of all features and User Stories added to the project. Taiga is available in more than 20 different languages.

Taiga integrates video conferencing functions with the use of third party services like Talky.io, Jitsi and Whereby.com. Group and private chat is done via Slack.

The on-premise version of Taiga can be downloaded from its GitHub repositories and used for free. The suggested self-managed support includes docker technology.

This project management system can interface with web-based version control repositories like GitHub, GitLab and Bitbucket. Taiga also provides several importers to facilitate migration from other proprietary software platforms.

== Background ==
=== Origins ===
Taiga formally came with the creation of Taiga Agile, LLC in February 2014 that provided the formal structure for the Taiga project. But its origins went back with the team at Kaleidos, a Madrid-based software company that initiated week-long hack-a-thons dedicated to personal improvement and prototyping of internal projects (of which Taiga was one).

=== Awards ===
Taiga won the 2015 Most Valued Agile Tool awarded by the Agile Portal. It's been cited as one of "Top 10 open source projects in 2014" and "Top 11 project management tools for 2016" by Opensource.com.

=== Usage ===
There are no official estimates as to how many people use Taiga but there are two data points that can be used to extrapolate. Taiga's landing page shows current SaaS 400K+ users. The number of Taiga self-managed instances is unknown but the combined docker pulls exceed 2 million. Taiga's own informal estimated user base is 20M+ users.
