= Joel Spolsky =

American software engineer and writer

- יואל ספולסקי
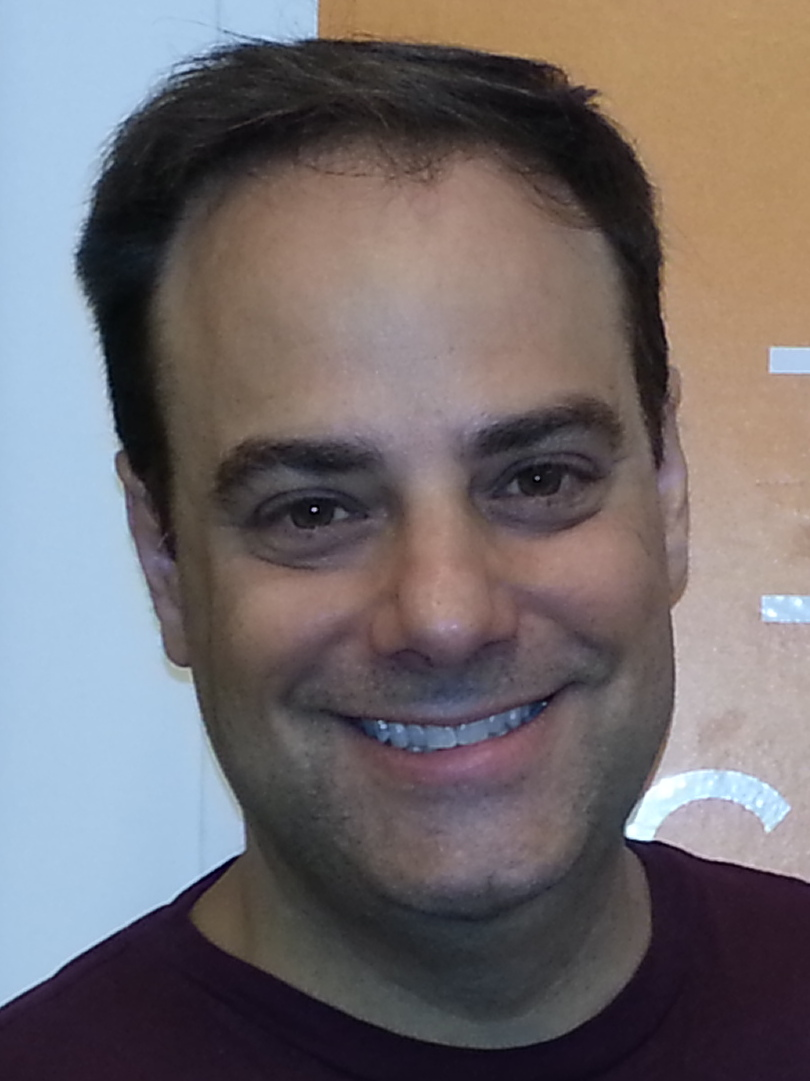
- Spolsky in 2014
- Born: 1965 (age 60–61); Albuquerque, New Mexico, United States
- Education: Yale University
- Occupations: Software developer CEO, Stack Exchange Network; Co-founder, Stack Overflow, Fog Creek Software and Trello
- Website: Joel on Software

Avram Joel Spolsky (Hebrew: אברם יואל ספולסקי; born 1965) is a software engineer and writer. He is the author of Joel on Software, a blog on software development, and the creator of the project management software Trello. He was a Program Manager on the Microsoft Excel team between 1991 and 1994. He later founded Fog Creek Software in 2000 and launched the Joel on Software blog.

== Biography ==
Spolsky was born to Jewish parents and grew up in Albuquerque, New Mexico, and lived there until he was 15. His family then moved with him to Israel, where he attended high school and completed his military service in the Paratroopers Brigade. He was one of the founders of the kibbutz Hanaton in Lower Galilee. In 1987, he returned to the United States to attend college. He studied at the University of Pennsylvania for a year before transferring to Yale University, where he was a member of Pierson College and graduated in 1991 with a BS summa cum laude in computer science.

Spolsky started working at Microsoft in 1991 as a program manager on the Microsoft Excel team, where he designed Excel Basic and drove Microsoft's Visual Basic for Applications strategy. He moved to New York City in 1995 where he worked for Viacom and Juno Online Services. In 2000, he founded Fog Creek Software and created the Joel on Software blog. Joel on Software was "one of the first blogs set up by a business owner".

In 2005, Spolsky co-produced and appeared in Aardvark'd: 12 Weeks with Geeks, a documentary documenting Fog Creek's development of Project Aardvark, a remote assistance tool.

In 2008, Spolsky co-founded Stack Overflow, a question and answer community website for software developers, with Jeff Atwood. He was CEO until Prashanth Chandrasekar succeeded him in the role on October 1, 2019. After Stack Overflow's sale in June 2021 for $1.8 billion, Spolsky stepped down as chairman.

In 2011, Spolsky launched Trello, an online project management tool inspired by Kanban methodology. The tool was acquired by Atlassian in January 2017 for $425 million.

In 2016, Spolsky announced the appointment of Anil Dash as Fog Creek Software's new CEO, with Spolsky continuing as Stack Overflow's CEO and as a Fog Creek Software board member. The company has since been renamed Glitch. Following its sale to Fastly in May 2022, Spolsky stepped down as chairman.

salon.com's Scott Rosenberg described one of Spolsky's work as an example of good writing "about their insular world in a way that wins the respect of their colleagues and the attention of outsiders."

=== Personal life ===
In 2015, Spolsky announced his marriage to his husband, Jared, on social media and his blog. In 2015, he reported on his own Web site that he lives on the Upper West Side of Manhattan.

== Publications ==
- Spolsky, Joel (2001). User Interface Design for Programmers. Apress. ISBN 1-893115-94-1.
- Spolsky, Joel (2004). Joel on Software: And on Diverse and Occasionally Related Matters That Will Prove of Interest to Software Developers, Designers, and Managers, and to Those Who, Whether by Good Fortune or Ill Luck, Work with Them in Some Capacity. Apress. ISBN 1-59059-389-8.
- Spolsky, Joel (2005). The Best Software Writing I: Selected and Introduced by Joel Spolsky. Apress. ISBN 1-59059-500-9.
- Spolsky, Joel (2007). Smart and Gets Things Done: Joel Spolsky's Concise Guide to Finding the Best Technical Talent. Apress. ISBN 978-1-59059-838-2.
- Spolsky, Joel (2008). More Joel on Software: Further Thoughts on Diverse and Occasionally Related Matters That Will Prove of Interest to Software Developers, Designers, and to Those Who, Whether by Good Fortune or Ill Luck, Work with Them in Some Capacity. Apress. ISBN 978-1-4302-0987-4.

== See also ==
- LGBT culture in New York City
- List of LGBT people from New York City
- Tech companies in the New York metropolitan area
- Leaky abstraction
- Architecture astronaut
