= Crackpot index =

Method of rating scientific claims

The Crackpot Index is a number that rates scientific claims or the individuals that make them, in conjunction with a method for computing that number. It was proposed by John C. Baez in 1992, and updated in 1998.

While the index was created for its humorous value, the general concepts can be applied in other fields like risk management.

== Baez's crackpot index ==
The method was initially proposed semi-seriously by mathematical physicist John C. Baez in 1992, and then revised in 1998. The index used responses to a list of 37 questions, each positive response contributing a point value ranging from 1 to 50; the computation is initialized with a value of −5. An earlier version only had 17 questions with point values for each ranging from 1 to 40.

Sample point assignments:

- 1 point for every statement that is widely agreed on to be false.
- 5 points for each mention of "Einstein", "Hawkins" or "Feynmann" [sic].
- 10 points for offering prize money to anyone who proves and/or finds any flaws in your theory.
- 20 points for every use of science fiction works or myths as if they were fact.
- 40 points for comparing those who argue against your ideas to Nazis, stormtroopers, or brownshirts.
- 50 points for claiming you have a revolutionary theory but giving no concrete testable predictions.

The New Scientist published a claim in 1992 that the creation of the index was "prompted by an especially striking outburst from a retired mathematician insisting that TIME has INERTIA". Baez later confirmed in a 1993 letter to New Scientist that he created the index. The index was later published in Skeptic magazine, with an editor's note saying "we know that outsiders to a field can make important contributions and even lead revolutions. But the chances of that happening are rather slim, especially when they meet many of the [Crackpot index] criteria".

Though the index was not proposed as a serious method, it nevertheless has become popular in Internet discussions of whether a claim or an individual is cranky, particularly in physics (e.g., at the Usenet newsgroup sci.physics), or in mathematics.

Chris Caldwell's Prime Pages has a version adapted to prime number research which is a field with many famous unsolved problems that are easy to understand for amateur mathematicians.

== Gruenberger's measure for crackpots ==
An earlier crackpot index is Fred J. Gruenberger's "A Measure for Crackpots" published in December 1962 by the RAND Corporation.

== See also ==
- List of topics characterized as pseudoscience
