= Jeff Atwood =

American software developer (born 1970)

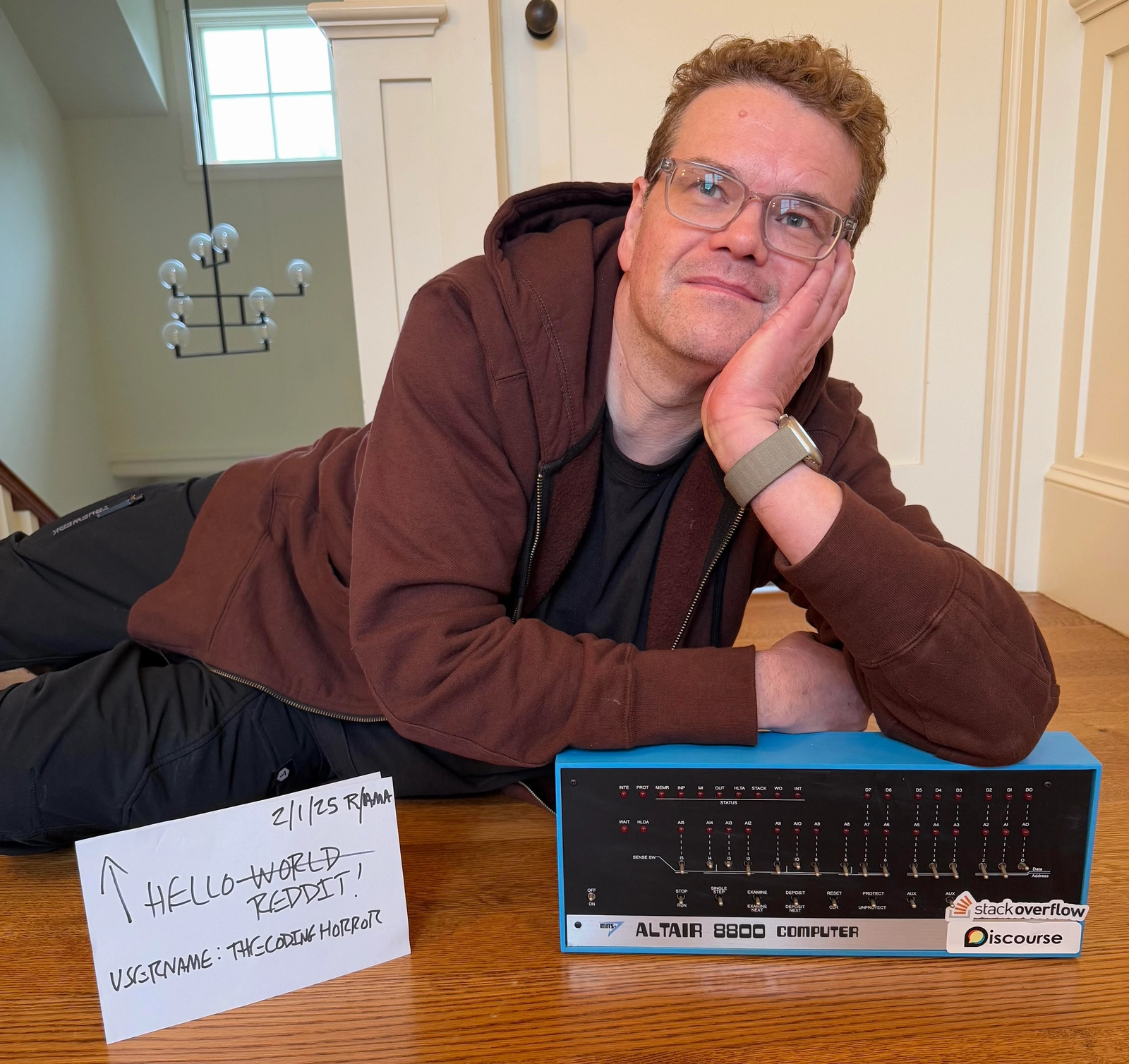
- Atwood in 2025
- Born: December 27, 1970 (age 55)
- Education: University of Virginia
- Occupations: Software developer, writer
- Known for: Coding Horror (blog), Stack Overflow, Stack Exchange
- Website: Coding Horror (blog)

Jeff Atwood (born 1970) is an American software developer, author, blogger, and entrepreneur. He co-founded the question-and-answer network Stack Exchange, which contains the Stack Overflow website for computer programming questions. He is the owner and writer of the computer programming blog Coding Horror, focused on programming and human factors.

== Early life and education ==
Atwood graduated from the University of Virginia in 1992 with a bachelor's degree in environmental science with a minor in computer science.

== Career ==
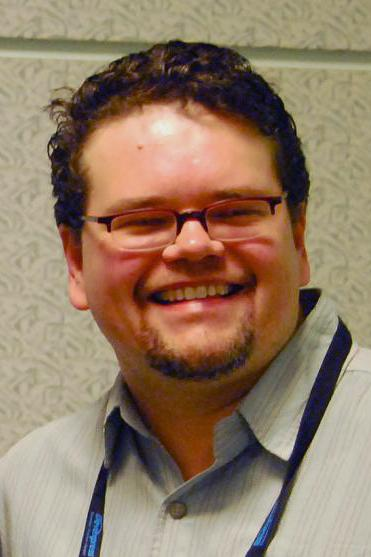
Atwood in 2008

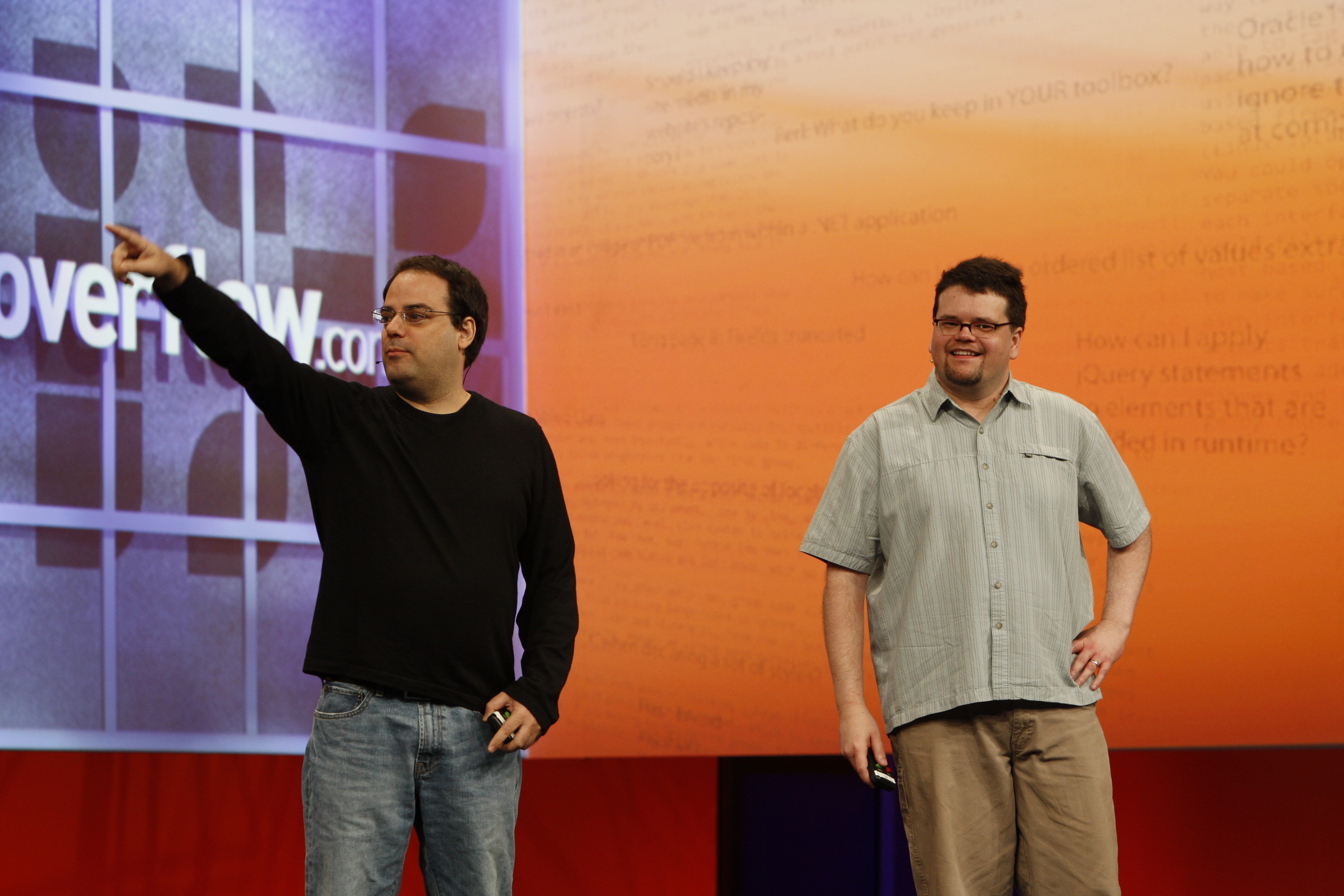
Joel Spolsky and Jeff Atwood at MIX 2009

Atwood started the programming blog Coding Horror in 2004. As a result, he met Joel Spolsky. In 2008, Spolsky and Atwood founded Stack Overflow, a programming question-and-answer website. The site was followed by Server Fault for system administrators and Super User for general computer-related questions, eventually becoming the Stack Exchange network, which includes many Q&A websites about topics decided on by the community.

Atwood and Spolsky published a weekly podcast covering the progress, Stack Exchange Podcast, and a wide range of software development issues. Jeff Atwood was also a keynote presenter at the 2008 Canadian University Software Engineering Conference.

In February 2012, Atwood left Stack Exchange to spend more time with his family.

On February 5, 2013, Atwood announced a new company, Civilized Discourse Construction Kit, Inc. The company develops open source server and client software for threaded discussions called Discourse. Atwood and others developed it out of frustration with then-current bulletin board software, which hadn't evolved since 1990. On February 1, 2023, he stepped down as CEO and assumed the role of Executive Chairman.

Atwood, together with WASD Keyboards, launched a mechanical keyboard, CODE, in 2013.

In 2021, Stack Overflow was sold to Prosus for $1.8 billion.

== Philanthropy ==
In January 2025, Atwood announced one million dollar gifts to eight non-profit organizations, including The Trevor Project, an organization dedicated to suicide prevention and crisis intervention for LGBTQ+ youth. In addition, Children's Hunger Fund, First Generation Investors, Global Refuge, NAACP Legal Defense and Educational Fund, PEN America, Planned Parenthood, and Team Rubicon received donations from Atwood and his family.

Atwood and his family have contributed to Alameda Post and the Alameda Food Bank. Atwood donated $1.5 million to 404 Media, a nonprofit news site. Atwood donated $100,000 to Precious Plastic, a nonprofit fighting plastic pollution.

In 2025, Atwood started the Rural Guaranteed Minimum Income Initiative (RGMII), studying the effects of cash payments to citizens in 3 rural counties: Mercer County, West Virginia, Beaufort County, North Carolina, and Warren County, Mississippi.

== Personal life ==
Atwood and his partner, Betsy Burton, have three children.

== Books ==
- The ASP.NET 2.0 Anthology: 101 Essential Tips, Tricks & Hacks, by Scott Allen, Jeff Atwood, Wyatt Barnett, Jon Galloway and Phil Haack. ISBN 978-0980285819
- Effective Programming: More Than Writing Code. ISBN 9781478300540
