= MathOverflow =

Mathematics question and answer website

MathOverflow is a mathematics question-and-answer (Q&A) website, which serves as an online community of mathematicians. It allows users to ask questions, submit answers, and rate both, all while getting merit points for their activities. It is a part of the Stack Exchange Network, but distinct from math.stackexchange.com.

It is primarily for asking questions on mathematics research – i.e. related to unsolved problems and the extension of knowledge of mathematics into areas that are not yet known – and does not welcome requests from non-mathematicians for instruction, for example homework exercises. It does welcome various questions on other topics that might normally be discussed among mathematicians, for example about publishing, refereeing, advising, getting tenure, etc. It is generally inhospitable to questions perceived as tendentious or argumentative.

== Origin and history ==
The website was started by Berkeley graduate students and postdocs Anton Geraschenko, David Zureick-Brown, and Kim Morrison on 28 September 2009 based on the idea of Sándor Kovács's NSF CAREER Grant. The hosting was supported by Ravi Vakil. The site originally ran on a separate installation of the StackExchange 1.0 software engine; on June 25, 2013, it was integrated in the regular Stack Exchange Network, running SE 2.0.

=== Naming ===
According to MathOverflow FAQ, the proper spelling is "MathOverflow" rather than "Math Overflow".

== Use of mathematical formulas ==
The original version of the website did not support LaTeX markup for mathematical formulas. To support most of the functionality of LaTeX, MathJax was added in order for the site to transform math equations into their appropriate forms. In its current state, any post including "Math Mode" (text between $s) will translate into proper mathematical notation.

== Usage ==
As of April 4, 2012, there were 16,496 registered users on MathOverflow, most of whom were located in the United States (35%), India (12%), and the United Kingdom (6%). By December 11, 2018, the number of registered users had grown to 87,850. As of June 2019, 123,448 questions have been posted.

In 2011, questions were answered an average of 3.9 hours after they were posted, and "Acceptable" answers took an average of 5.01 hours.

== Reception ==
- Terence Tao compared it to "the venerable newsgroup sci.math, but with more modern, 'Web 2.0' features".
- John C. Baez writes that "website 'Math Overflow' has become a universal clearinghouse for math questions".
- According to Gil Kalai, MathOverflow "is ran [sic] by an energetic and impressive group of very (very very) young people".
- Jordan Ellenberg comments that the website "offers a constantly changing array of new questions" and is "addictive" in a "particularly pure form", as he compares it to the Polymath Project.
- Jared Keller in The Atlantic writes: "Math Overflow is almost an anti-social network, focused solely on productively addressing the problems posed by its users." He quotes Kim Morrison saying: "Mathematicians as a whole are surprisingly skeptical of many aspects of the modern Internet... In particular, things like Facebook, Twitter, etc. are viewed as enormous wastes of time."

== See also ==
- List of mathematical software
- nLab
- PhysicsOverflow
- Project Euler — computational mathematics and computer programming problem solving website
