= NLab =

Wiki for mathematics, physics, and philosophy

nLab
- Founded: November 28, 2008
- Creator: Urs Schreiber
- Website: ncatlab.org
- Written in: Ruby, Python

The nLab is a wiki for research-level notes, expositions and collaborative work. It includes original research in mathematics, physics, and philosophy with a focus on methods from type theory, category theory, and homotopy theory. The nLab espouses the "n-point of view" (a deliberate pun on Wikipedia's "neutral point of view"), which is that type theory, homotopy theory, category theory, and higher category theory provide a useful, unifying viewpoint for mathematics, physics and philosophy.

The n in n-point of view could refer to either n-categories as found in higher category theory, n-groupoids as found in both homotopy theory and higher category theory, or n-types as found in homotopy type theory.

== Overview ==
The nLab was originally conceived to provide a repository for ideas (and even new research) generated in the comments on posts at the n-Category Café, a group blog run at the time by John C. Baez, David Corfield and Urs Schreiber. Eventually the nLab developed into an independent project, which has since grown to include whole research projects and encyclopedic material.

Associated with the nLab is the nForum: an online discussion forum for announcement and discussion of nLab edits (the analog of Wikipedia's "talk" pages) as well as for general discussion of the topics covered in the nLab. The preferred way of contacting the nLab steering committee is to post on the nForum. An experimental sub-project of the nLab is the 'Publications of the nLab', intended as a journal for refereed research articles that are published online and cross-hyperlinked with the main wiki. This sub-project appears to be inactive as of 2014.

The nLab was set up on November 28, 2008 by Urs Schreiber using the Instiki software provided and maintained by Jacques Distler. Since May 2015 it runs on a server at Carnegie Mellon University that is funded in the context of Steve Awodey's Homotopy Type Theory MURI grant. The domain ncatlab.org is owned by Urs Schreiber.

The nLab is listed on MathOverflow as a standard online mathematics reference to check before asking questions. Many questions and answers link to the nLab for background material. It is one of two wikis mentioned by the mathematical physicist John C. Baez in his review of math blogs for the American Mathematical Society.

There was for many years an informal steering committee, which did not run the nLab, but existed in order to resolve issues that could have caused the whole project to run into trouble.

The content of this wiki is not placed under a specific copyright license.

== See also ==
- MathOverflow
