= Experts Exchange =

Website for computer questions

- Available in: English
- Owner: Randy Redberg
- Website: experts-exchange.com
- Commercial: Yes
- Registration: Yes
- Launched: 1996
- Current status: Active

Experts Exchange (EE) is a website for people in information technology (IT) related jobs to ask each other for tech help, primarily through the use of a question-and-answer (Q&A) forum and published technical articles.

== History ==
Experts Exchange went live in October 1996. The first question asked was for a "Case sensitive Win31 HTML Editor".

Experts Exchange went bankrupt in 2001 after venture capitalists moved the company to San Mateo, CA, and was brought back largely through the efforts of unpaid volunteers.

Later, Austin Miller and Randy Redberg took ownership of Experts Exchange, and the company was made profitable again. Experts Exchange claims to have more than 3 million solutions.

== Marketing ==
Experts Exchange has marketed itself as "not unlike Stack Overflow or Quora," but with an emphasis on human Q&A and an encouragement to ask questions even if they have been asked before.

== Membership model ==
Under their current model, Experts Exchange uses a hybrid of paid and free memberships. Users who participate and answer questions can become eligible for free membership known as "Expert Status" while other users can opt to pay for a membership and use the site solely for asking questions.

== See also ==
- Internet forum
- Stack Exchange
- Virtual community
