= John C. Baez =

American mathematical physicist (b. 1961)

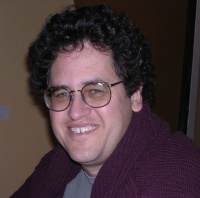
- Baez in August 2009
- Born: John Carlos Baez; June 12, 1961 (age 65); San Francisco, California, U.S.
- Education: Princeton University (AB); Massachusetts Institute of Technology (PhD)
- Spouse: Lisa Raphals
- Awards: Levi L. Conant Prize (2013)
- Scientific career
- Fields: Mathematics, mathematical physics
- Workplaces: University of California, Riverside
- Thesis: Conformally Invariant Quantum Fields (1986)
- Doctoral advisor: Irving Segal
- Doctoral students: Alissa Crans

John Carlos Baez (/ˈbaɪ.ɛz/ BY-ez; born June 12, 1961) is an American mathematical physicist and a professor of mathematics at the University of California, Riverside (UCR) in Riverside, California. He has worked on spin foams in loop quantum gravity, applications of higher categories to physics, and applied category theory. Additionally, Baez is known on the World Wide Web as the author of the crackpot index.

== Education ==
John C. Baez attended Princeton University where he graduated with an A.B. in mathematics in 1982; his senior thesis was titled "Recursivity in quantum mechanics", under the supervision of John P. Burgess. He earned his doctorate in 1986 from the Massachusetts Institute of Technology under the direction of Irving Segal.

== Career ==
Baez was a post-doctoral researcher at Yale University. Since 1989, he has been a faculty member at UC Riverside. From 2010 to 2012, he was a visiting professor at the Centre for Quantum Technologies in Singapore and continued working there in the summers until at least 2016.

=== Research ===
His research includes work on spin foams in loop quantum gravity. He also worked on applications of higher categories to physics, such as the cobordism hypothesis. He has also dedicated many efforts towards applied category theory, including network theory and has published over 105 papers.

=== Recognition ===
Baez won the 2013 Levi L. Conant Prize for his expository paper with John Huerta, "The algebra of grand unified theories". He was named a Fellow of the American Mathematical Society, in the 2022 class of fellows, "for contributions to higher category theory and mathematical physics, and for popularization of these subjects".

=== Forums ===
Baez is the author of This Week's Finds in Mathematical Physics, an irregular column on the internet featuring mathematical exposition and criticism. He started This Week's Finds in 1993 for the Usenet community, and it now has a following in its new form, the blog Azimuth. This Week's Finds anticipated the concept of a personal weblog. Baez creates blog posts about topics or questions he wants to understand more through his column publishings. Azimuth also covers other topics that include combating climate change and various other environmental issues.

He is also co-founder of the n-Category Café (or n-Café), a group blog concerning higher category theory and its applications, as well as its philosophical repercussions. The founders of the blog are Baez, David Corfield and Urs Schreiber, and the list of blog authors has extended since. The n-Café community is associated with the nLab wiki and nForum forum, which now run independently of n-Café. It is hosted on The University of Texas at Austin's official website.

== Family ==
Baez's uncle Albert Baez was a physicist and a co-inventor of the X-ray microscope; Albert interested him in physics as a child. Through Albert, he is cousins with singers Joan Baez and Mimi Fariña.

John Baez is married to Lisa Raphals who is a professor of Chinese and comparative literature from ancient Greece at UCR.

== Selected publications ==
=== Papers ===
- Baez, John C.; Dolan, James (1995). "Higher-dimensional algebra and topological quantum field theory". Journal of Mathematical Physics. 36 (11). College Park, MD: American Institute of Physics: 6073–6105. arXiv:q-alg/9503002. Bibcode:1995JMP....36.6073B. doi:10.1063/1.531236. ISSN 0022-2488. MR 1355899. S2CID 14908618.
- Baez, John C. (2002). "The Octonions". Bulletin of the American Mathematical Society. 39 (2). Providence, RI: American Mathematical Society : 145–205. arXiv:math/0105155. doi:10.1090/S0273-0979-01-00934-X. ISSN 0273-0979. MR 1886087. S2CID 586512.
- Baez, John C.; Huerta, John (2010). "The algebra of grand unified theories". Bull. Amer. Math. Soc. 47 (3). Providence, RI: American Mathematical Society: 483–552. arXiv:0904.1556. Bibcode:2009arXiv0904.1556B. doi:10.1090/S0273-0979-10-01294-2. MR 2651086. S2CID 2941843. Zbl 1196.81252.
- Baez, John C.; Hoffnung, Alexander E.; Rogers, Christopher L. (2010). "Categorified Symplectic Geometry and the Classical String". Communications in Mathematical Physics. 293 (3). Berlin: Springer: 701–725. arXiv:0808.0246. Bibcode:2010CMaPh.293..701B. doi:10.1007/s00220-009-0951-9. ISSN 1432-0916. MR 2566161. S2CID 14358807. Zbl 1192.81208.
- Baez, John C.; Huerta, John (2014). "G_{2} and the rolling ball". Transactions of the American Mathematical Society. 366 (10). Providence, RI: American Mathematical Society: 5257–5293. arXiv:1205.2447. doi:10.1090/s0002-9947-2014-05977-1. ISSN 1088-6850. MR 3240924. S2CID 50818244.
- Baez, John C. (2018). "From the Icosahedron to E_{8}". London Math. Soc. Newsletter. 476. London, UK: 18–23. arXiv:1712.06436. Bibcode:2017arXiv171206436B. ISSN 2516-3841. MR 3792329. S2CID 119151549. Zbl 1476.51020.

=== Books ===
- Baez, John C.; Segal, Irving E.; Zhou, Zhengfang (1992). An Introduction to Algebraic and Constructive Quantum Field Theory. Princeton Series in Physics. Vol. 47. Princeton, NJ: Princeton University Press. ISBN 978-1-4008-6250-4. ISSN 1052-8083. MR 1178936. OCLC 889252663.
- Baez, John C., ed. (1994). Knots and Quantum Gravity. Oxford Lecture Series in Mathematics and its Applications. Vol. 1. Oxford: Oxford University Press. ISBN 978-0198534907. ISSN 2059-9854. OCLC 30509964.
- Baez, John C.; Muniain, Javier P. (1994). Gauge fields, knots and gravity. Series on Knots and Everything. Vol. 4. River Edge, NJ: World Scientific Publishing Co., Inc. doi:10.1142/2324. ISBN 978-9810220341. ISSN 0219-9769. MR 1313910. OCLC 30779834.
- Baez, John C.; May, J. Peter, eds. (2009). Towards Higher Categories. The IMA Volumes in Mathematics and its Applications. Vol. 157. New York, NY: Springer-Verlag. doi:10.1007/978-1-4419-1524-5. ISBN 978-1441915238. ISSN 0940-6573. MR 2664168. OCLC 778311627.
- Baez, John C.; Baratin, Aristide; Laurent, Freidel; Derek, Wise (2012). Infinite-Dimensional Representations of 2-Groups. Memoirs of the American Mathematical Society. Vol. 1032. Providence, RI: American Mathematical Society. ISBN 978-0-8218-7284-0. ISSN 0065-9266. OCLC 5581307110.
- Baez, John C; Biamonte, Jacob D. (2018). Quantum Techniques for Stochastic Mechanics. Singapore: World Scientific Press. arXiv:1209.3632. doi:10.1142/10623. ISBN 978-9813226937. OCLC 1027138118. S2CID 119650940.
