= Question and answer system =

Online question and answer software system

A question and answer system (Q&A system) is an online software program that attempts to answer its users' questions. Q&A software is frequently integrated by large and specialist corporations and primarily used as a community that enables users in related fields to exchange questions and respond to both general and specialized questions.

There are numerous examples of Q&A software in both open source and SaaS formats, including Qhub, OSQA, Question2Answer, and Stack Exchange. Communities such as Quora or Stack Exchange are closed source Q&A sites.

== History ==
Q&A software is often provided to corporate and specialist sites, so the site and its users can be asked questions as well as provide or receive expert answers to them. This type of software is very helpful for answering inquiries about specialized industries. Users may learn by regularly answering questions or exchanging views with other industry specialists using the website.

In the late 1990s, a free online service called Answer Point provided by Ask Jeeves, was launched, allowing users to ask questions and with the help of other people, have them answered. The slogan of the service, "The Ask Jeeves Answer Point is the place where you can ask and answer questions. Have a question? Post it! Know the answer? Post it!", indicated the main function of it, which inspired the creation of later Q&A sites. The last archived version of the Ask Point was from late 2001 when it still allowed registration.

Since then, more and more sites have begun to offer Q&A services. Google launched its Q&A service called Google Questions and Answers in August 2001 which used Google staffers to answer questions by e-mail. A flat fee (US$3.00) was involved for an answer. In April 2002, Google launched Google Answers, which allowed users to post answers to questions, to replace its predecessor. Google Answers cost askers $2 to $200 for an accepted answer. By late December 2006, it was fully closed to new activity.

In early 2000s, Yahoo! launched its online Q&A service called Ask Yahoo!, which was later replaced by the beta version of Yahoo! Answers on December 8, 2005. Ask Yahoo! was discontinued in March 2006. Yahoo! Answers give members the chance to earn points, thus encouraging user participation. To support countries using non-English characters, Yahoo! Answers operate different platforms in some Asian countries, such as Yahoo! Chiebukuro (Yahoo!知恵袋?) in Japan and as Yahoo! Knowledge in Korea, Taiwan, China, and Hong Kong.

Quora was founded in June 2009, while the website was made available to the public on June 21, 2010. Users can collaborate by editing questions and suggesting edits to other users' answers.

Stack Exchange was launched in September 2009 and features a network of specialized communities with some degree of self-moderation.

From 2010 with the widespread use of smartphones and tablets, there is an increasing number of Q&A sites that decide to launch mobile applications. Popular Q&A sites like Yahoo! Answers and Quora have launched their own mobile applications.

== Classification ==
An online Q&A service serves the public with its ease of getting access without temporal and spatial constraints. The mechanisms are standardized: Questioners express their information needs in the form of a question, and people (experts, or other users in the system) answer those questions based on their knowledge.

Online Q&A service can be classified into several types in terms of who answer questions, and how services maintain and control the quality of information. Shah et al. (2009) classified online Q&A service into three categories:

- Digital reference services: Also known as virtual reference, it is an extended version of traditional reference service where users in the library can get help from librarians with identifying desired materials. The advantage comes from the fact that users can have access anytime without physical constraints. The current services in this type include Ask an IPL Librarian of the Internet Public Library, and the Educators' Reference Desk
- Expert services: Represents a technological and social way of providing quality question answering service. This service is staffed by domain experts. Organizations other than libraries offer Q&A service where experts in a specific area answer questions. Some are fee-based (e.g., NetWellness http://www.netwellness.org), whereas others offer free-service (e.g., PickAnswer http://pickanswer.com)
- Social Q&A (community Q&A): In social Q&A services, any user in the community can ask or answer questions. Since a question can receive attention from many people unlike expert service, questioners are likely to benefit from the wisdom of crowds. The set of answers made by a large number of people often surpasses answers from experts in a traditional Q&A service. For example, Harper, Raban, Rafaeli, and Konstan (2008) showed that a social Q&A system ended up with a better quality of answers than those of library reference services by comparing existing services. Established examples of community Q&A sites are Stack Exchange and Quora.

=== Change of Q&A community features ===
Community Q&A sites involved everyday users in answering questions – it largely increased the number of contributors. One of the problems of these communities is that it is hard to control the quality of answers compared with "ask an expert service". In recent years, community Q&A sites tend to embrace newer interaction designs than the other types of Q&A sites, by providing features like tagging and rating interfaces, RSS feeds, and highly interactive browsing and searching capabilities. These features used the crowd power to evaluate the quality of answers and also the reliability of the contributors. Some communities as Zhihu tags the users received highest votes in a given domain as "Excellent answer provider". These new features generally integrate some expert verification and service into Q&A community sites.

== Mechanisms ==
=== Social and information structure ===
Originally, Q&A communities had little structural or role-based organization. In recent years, some communities started to form social and information structures. This is driven by the increasing number of contributors and the adoption of new features as mentioned above. Research shows that there are three different connection networks (or graphs) inside communities such as Quora. A graph connecting topics to users, a social graph connecting users, and a graph connecting related questions. These connections help users find the topic that they are looking for and build a social connection with people sharing the same interests. Also, as contributors gather according to a common theme, their votes help to screen out the domain expert and the high quality questions in that field. The heterogeneity in the user and question graphs are significant contributors to the quality of the community's knowledge base.

=== Motivations ===
Although many online Q&A communities do not include financial rewards for users' knowledge-contribution behaviors or reputation-ranking mechanisms, while also featuring no direct mutual interest between its users, trusting the software and the Internet environment provides some motivation to share knowledge. People who trust the software more tend to be involved more in question and answer activities. The knowledge contribution from others leads to even more people to share their knowledge. Users who read more contributed knowledge tend to contribute more generally. Users are also seeking recognition when they contribute knowledge on the Q&A software. Social rewards such as approval, status, and respect play a very important role in motivating people to contribute to the Q&A software. User's eagerness of showing their knowledge and expertise and the potential chance of being noticed by recruiters also play a role in motivating people to answer questions and contribute questions. Gamification can explain the appeal of displaying statistics or getting awarded with badges and similar for contributions to Q&A communities.

The social capital, social exchange, and social cognitive theories explain why users may continuously contribute knowledge to online social Q&A communities. However, some potential users may also feel hesitant to contribute due to fear of criticism from or of misleading online community members The contributors can have intrinsic or extrinsic motivation to contribute. Further, the motivations to share knowledge can be categorized into individual-based and organization or website based motivations. Website based motivations (extrinsic) include rewards and incentives to the contributions like for example upvotes or coupons. Individual-based motivations (intrinsic) would constitute factors like a belief in knowledge ownership, individual characteristics, interpersonal trust, and will for justice. Specifically, two kinds of motivations drive people to participate in online Q&A: Why do people ask questions, and why do others answer these questions?

Motivation for asking: While there are many different ways of fulfilling information needs, a large number of people are asking questions in online Q&A services. What motivates people to take advantage of those systems? And what do users expect from using these systems? Choi (2014) surveyed 200 people who actively asked questions on Yahoo! Answers, and asked them the motivations and expectations of asking behaviors in online Q&A system. The five most significant factors of asking behaviors in the survey are:

- Learning; Self-education through acquiring information
- Having fun asking a question
- Seeking advice or opinions for making decisions
- Finding relevant information
- Gaining a sense of security through knowledge

Expectation from askers: The next step regarding the cycle of question and answering behaviors is for askers to assess answers to see if answers meet their expectations from information needs. In the same survey examined by Choi (2014), the most desired factor was “Additional or alternative information (4.03 / 5)”, followed by “Accurate and complete information”. It is interesting that factors related to information itself surpassed “social and emotional support (2.47 / 5)” which is related to affective needs.

Motivation for answering: Answering behaviors have raised curiosity among researchers, because there is in general no explicit compensations against the activity. Raban and Harper (2008) asked people who answered questions on social Q&A about the motivation of their answering behavior as well in the same survey. The top ranked motivations are:

- Reputation enhancement
- Enjoyment in helping others
- Reciprocity
- Knowledge self-efficacy
- Satisfaction
- Confirmation
- Continuance intention

=== Crowdsourcing ===
Q&A software uses a sourcing model called crowdsourcing to obtain answers to posted questions. Crowdsourcing is the act of outsourcing work to an undefined, networked labor using an open call for participation, and it is used to support the activities on most Q&A software (such as Stack Exchange, Quora, etc.). This technique allows the user to obtain answers from a large community, with lower costs and defect rates to the developers.

The user asks their question which can be answered by any member of that online community. The answers then go through an assessment, wherein the good answers are upvoted and the bad answers are downvoted by the users (or a similar parallel on different platforms). The members of the online community can find a question that needs answering to and answer that question.

This type of crowd participation in a Q&A platform has the potential to increase the knowledge of individual users, thus improving and speeding up their work process. The abundance of information to which users are exposed through this system is effectively changing the way people collaborate, communicate and learn in online communities.

=== Other defining features ===
Some other defining features a Q&A software include:

- Differentiation of questions and answers (features that affect answers should not affect the question)
- Differentiation of answers (replies to the question) and comments (replies to an answer)
- User voting of answers
- Sorting of answers by votes and questions by answered status
- Approval of an answer
- Question tagging and tag search
- Marking a question as a duplicate of another one (if the event occurs)

== Impact ==
Q&A sites and software as a way of coordinating development and user support activities, compared to the traditional mailing list, have a significant impact on user behavior.

A large number of users shifted from mailing lists to Q&A software. In addition, users of Q&A software tend to provide answer faster. Q&A software and websites are considered forms of crowdsourcing systems, they have wide-ranging impacts that can be either positive or negative.

== Comparison ==
A complete comparison of Q&A sites can be found at Comparison of Q&A sites and Comparison of wiki software.

This table shows self-hostable Q&A software solutions.

| | Stable release date | Free software | Committers | Size | Multilingual | Language | Abuse prevention | Private questions | Authentication | Customisation | Web API | Export, import | Other |
|---|---|---|---|---|---|---|---|---|---|---|---|---|---|
| Askbot | 2017-03-01 | Yes (GPLv3) | 100+ | 30k+ questions in some sites | Yes | Python | Partial (moderators, premoderation recommended) | Partial | LDAP, OpenID, OAuth | Skins, other | Partial (read-only, only questions) | Yes (conversion from some apps, server-side dump import/export) | Email Q&A, autotweeting, user tags newsletter, other |
| Atlassian Confluence Question | | No | | 25k+ questions in one site | | | | | | | | Unpublished migration script from OSQA exists. | |
| Biostars | 2012-04-23 | Yes (MIT) | 10+ | 45k+ questions in the top site | | Python | | | | | Maybe | | |
| Discourse (software) | 2021-10-21 | Yes (GPLv2) | 800+ | 1500+ sites | Yes | Ruby, JavaScript | | | | | | | |
| OSQA | 2011? (2015 master) | Maybe (GPLv3; open core version of Answerhub) | 30+ | 25k question top, 5k+ in multiple sites | | | Maybe | | | | | | |
| Phabricator Ponder | 2015 | Yes (Apache v.2) | | | | PHP | | | | | Maybe | | |
| Pligg core "story submission" | 2014-08 | Maybe (CC-BY) | 5+ | 2k+ | | | | | | | | | |
| QPixel (Codidact) | 2020-12-17 | Yes (AGPLv3) | 30+ | 10k+ questions in one site | No | Ruby, JavaScript | | | | Yes | | Import from StackExchange with linking profiles | Support for multiple communities within a single installation, multiple categories within a single community |
| Question2Answer | 2019-01-12 | Yes, GPL | 15+ | 20k+ sites, 6m+ questions | Yes | PHP | Yes | Partial | | Themes, Plugins | | | |

== See also ==
- Comparison of Q&A sites
- Knowledge market
- Online community
- Crowdsourcing
- Reputation system
