= Urs Schreiber =

Theoretical physicist and mathematician

Urs Schreiber (born 1974) is a mathematician specializing in the connection between mathematics and theoretical physics (especially string theory) and currently working as a researcher at New York University Abu Dhabi. He was previously a researcher at the Czech Academy of Sciences, Institute of Mathematics, Department for Algebra, Geometry and Mathematical Physics.

== Education ==
Schreiber obtained his doctorate from the University of Duisburg-Essen in 2005 with a thesis supervised by Robert Graham and titled From Loop Space Mechanics to Nonabelian Strings.

== Work ==
Schreiber's research fields include the mathematical foundation of quantum field theory.

Schreiber is a co-creator of the nLab, a wiki for research mathematicians and physicists working in higher category theory.

== Selected writings ==
- With Hisham Sati, Mathematical Foundations of Quantum Field and Perturbative String Theory, Proceedings of Symposia in Pure Mathematics, volume 83 AMS (2011)
- Fiorenza, Domenico; Sati, Hisham; Schreiber, Urs (2023). The Character Map in Non-abelian Cohomology: Twisted, Differential, and Generalized. World Scientific Publishing. ISBN 978-981-127-669-9. doi:10.1142/13422.
- Schreiber, Urs (2013). "Differential cohomology in a cohesive ∞-topos". arXiv:1310.7930v1 [math-ph].
