= Antedating (disambiguation) =

Backdating or antedating is when a document is signed with a timestamp that has an earlier (older) date and/or time than when the document is actually signed.

Antedating can also refer to:

- Antedating (lexicography), finding attested use of a word or phrase earlier than the previous earliest known use
- Antedated contract, takes effect earlier than its signing date
- Antedated cheque, dated earlier than its date of signing

== See also ==
- Forward dating, signing a document with a timestamp representing a later (more recent) point in time than the time the document was actually signed
- Chronological dating, attributing an event to a date in the past such that chronology is established
