= BioWare =

Canadian video game developer

BioWare Corp.

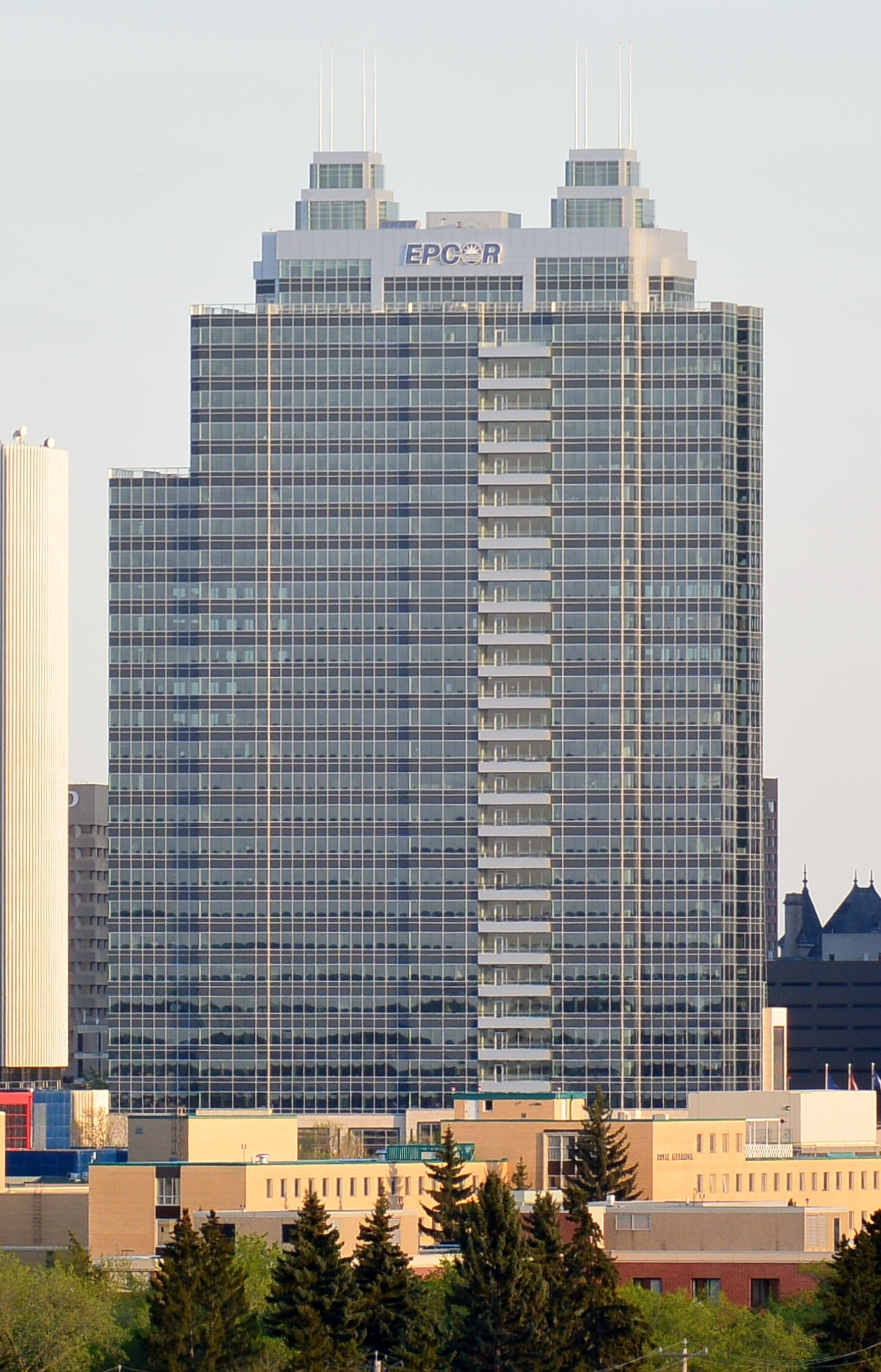
- Headquarters at the Epcor Tower in 2016
- Type: Subsidiary
- Industry: Video games
- Founded: 1 February 1995; 31 years ago
- Founders: Ray Muzyka; Greg Zeschuk; Augustine Yip
- Defunct: 2026; 0 years ago
- Fate: Pending closure
- Headquarters: Edmonton, Alberta, Canada
- Key people: Gary McKay; (Vice-president and general manager)
- Products: List of BioWare video games
- Number of employees: <100 (2025)
- Parent: VG Holding Corp. (2005–2007); Electronic Arts (2007–2026)
- Subsidiaries: See § Subsidiaries
- Website: bioware.com

BioWare was a Canadian video game developer based in Edmonton, Alberta. It was founded in 1995 by newly graduated medical doctors Ray Muzyka, Greg Zeschuk and Augustine Yip. The company was acquired by American publisher Electronic Arts in 2007.

BioWare specialized in role-playing video games, and achieved recognition for developing highly praised and successful licensed franchises: Baldur's Gate, Neverwinter Nights, and Star Wars: Knights of the Old Republic. They proceeded to make several other successful games based on original intellectual property: Jade Empire, the Mass Effect series, and the Dragon Age series. In 2011, BioWare launched their first massively multiplayer online role-playing game (MMORPG), Star Wars: The Old Republic.

On 4 August 2026, publisher Electronic Arts was acquired by Saudi Arabia's Public Investment Fund, leading to an announcement on 21 October 2026 that they intended to close the studio.

== History ==
=== 1995 – 2000: Foundation, Shattered Steel, and Baldur's Gate ===
BioWare was founded by Ray Muzyka and Greg Zeschuk, and Augustine Yip in 1995. Of the founding team, Muzyka, Zeschuk and Yip had recently graduated from medical school at the University of Alberta, and had a background in programming for use in school. Together with Yip, they had created a medical simulation programme. The three also played video games for recreation, eventually deciding to develop their own. Their success in the medical field provided them with the funding they needed to launch a video game company. To make their first game, they pooled their resources, $100,000 each, which resulted in capital of $300,000. The company was incorporated on 1 February 1995, and formally launched on 22 May 1995.

Their first game, Shattered Steel, began its life as a proof-of-concept demo, similar to the MechWarrior games. This demo was submitted to ten publishers, seven of whom returned to the company with an offer. BioWare reached an agreement with Interplay Entertainment to become their publisher for Shattered Steel. Brent Oster and Trent Oster formed Pyrotek Studios, which continued developing Shattered Steel but broke up a year later, with Trent joining BioWare as an early employee to finish the game. BioWare's first game was released the following year, described by IGN as a "modest success" with "decent sales".

BioWare's founders and staff were keenly interested in both computerized and pen-and-paper variants of role-playing games, and became determined to create a similar experience for the PC. Scott Greig had coded an engine for a real-time strategy prototype called Battleground: Infinity, which was converted into a demo for a role-playing game experience. Meanwhile, Interplay had just acquired the Dungeons & Dragons license from Strategic Simulations. After presenting their demo to Interplay under the working title Iron Throne, Brian Fargo offered BioWare the Dungeons & Dragons license and suggested the title Baldur's Gate. The BioWare team reworked the game to fit the Dungeons & Dragons rules and setting, with Trent Osler as lead designer. Yip continued to balance his role with his medical practice, and Muzyka and Zeschuck left the medical profession to work on the game full-time. The game was delayed by one year in order to meet its ambitions.

Upon its release in 1998, Baldur's Gate sold more than two million copies, nearly matching the sales of Diablo. The success of the game also led the game's technology to be licensed to other studios, where the Infinity Engine was used for Planescape: Torment and the Icewind Dale series. The success of Baldur's Gate was followed by an expansion pack for the game in 1999 called Tales of the Sword Coast. BioWare also considered making a sequel to Shattered Steel, but eventually worked on a sequel to MDK from Shiny Entertainment. MDK2 was released on PC, Dreamcast, and eventually PlayStation 2, becoming BioWare's first console game, and drawing praise that matched the support for the first title.

=== 2000 – 2006: Dungeons & Dragons, Star Wars, and new partners ===
Logo used by BioWare for almost two decades, from Baldur's Gate to Mass Effect: Andromeda

BioWare hoped to turn Baldur's Gate series into a trilogy. As the team returned to the Dungeons & Dragons licence for the sequel, James Ohlen became inspired by the level of character development and romance seen in Final Fantasy VII. This led to the release of Baldur's Gate II: Shadows of Amn in 2000, matching the first game's commercial success with two million units sold.

In July 2000, BioWare announced that they were working with LucasArts to create a Star Wars role-playing video game for the PC and next-generation consoles. By this time, the Infinity Engine used for both Baldur's Gate games becoming outdated, leading BioWare to discuss a new vision for another game in the Forgotten Realms setting from Dungeons & Dragons. Interplay felt that these change made it inappropriate to use the Baldur's Gate name on the next game, deciding that Snowblind Studios would make Baldur's Gate: Dark Alliance using a new engine. Interplay and Bioware agreed to utilize the Dungeons & Dragons license to produce a different game with a new game engine, which would be entitled Neverwinter Nights.

However, Interplay and its parent company began to struggle financially. On November 29, 2001, BioWare ended its partnership with Interplay, citing unpaid royalties and sublicensing their games without their consent. Subsequently, BioWare began working with Infogrames, which was later renamed to Atari. The dispute with Interplay was eventually settled, transferring the license and publishing rights for Neverwinter Nights to BioWare and Atari.

Released in 2002, Neverwinter Nights went on to sell more than 2 million copies, while Interplay and its parent company entered a decline leading to bankruptcy. The new role-playing game received universal acclaim, and its Aurora toolset was shared with the player audience, leading to a community that expanded the game with custom content.

In 2003, BioWare released Star Wars: Knights of the Old Republic to critical acclaim, eventually selling over 3 million copies. The game was notable as an early example of a successful cross platform game, particularly with a Western role-playing game first released as an Xbox console exclusive.

In 2005, Bioware released the martial arts role-playing game Jade Empire. The game expanded the choice and consequence seen in prior BioWare RPGs, but as some content was only seen by few players, the studio began to refine the formula to ensure more players would see optional content. It was during this time that BioWare began pre-production on two original game series, with early development on a spiritual successor to Baldur's Gate called Dragon Age in 2002, as well as early concepts for Mass Effect in 2004. The "big giant space opera" was envisioned at a meeting between Muzyka, Zeschuk, and Casey Hudson, foreseeing it as a trilogy that would emphasize space exploration, romantic relationships, with more mature content compared to their previous games.

In November 2005, BioWare and Pandemic Studios (itself founded by former Activision employees) were acquired by a private equity fund known as Elevation Partners, creating a holding corporation for the joint venture. BioWare and Pandemic preferred venture capital as a way to maintain their existing publishing relationships without ceding control to a traditional video game publisher, raising a total of $300 million dollars. The CEO for the new joint holding company was John Riccitiello, a former president of Electronic Arts. In March 2006, BioWare opened a new studio in Austin, Texas, working on an unannounced massively multiplayer online role-playing game. The new satellite studio began work on a licensed Star Wars massively multiplayer game, leading BioWare to announce another partnership with LucasArts, promising the "details of which will be unveiled at a later date".

=== 2007 – 2009: EA acquisition, Mass Effect, and Dragon Age ===
On 11 October 2007, Electronic Arts acquired BioWare by purchasing its holding company from Elevation Partners for US$775 million, as part of a deal that included Pandemic Studios.

One month later, BioWare released the science fiction role-playing game Mass Effect, earning multiple awards and nominations at the end of the year. The game notably attracted criticism from local Christian talk shows and Fox News for sexual content, which Fox later retracted after admitting they had never played the game. The game's director, Casey Hudson, began to plan for a Mass Effect trilogy where decisions cascade across three games. The team was given less time to produce a sequel, but production benefited from removing several features seen in the first game.

In 2008, BioWare completed their first handheld console on the Nintendo DS, releating Sonic Chronicles: The Dark Brotherhood to disappointing sales numbers. Around this time, the team explored a handheld adaptation of the Mass Effect series, working on Mass Effect: Corsair with gameplay inspired by the Star Control series. EA became skeptical of projected sales on the Nintendo DS and cancelled the project. This period also included work towards Jade Empire sequel, which transitioned into a spiritual successor codenamed Revolver before its cancellation in 2008. The studio also privately cancelled a spy-themed role-playing game codenamed Agent.

In March 2009, BioWare opened a Montreal studio to support work on a Mass Effect sequel, and the development of Star Wars: The Old Republic as a licensed massively multiplayer online game. By June, Electronic Arts merged Mythic Entertainment into a single role-playing and massively multiplayer game development group, led by BioWare co-founder Ray Muzyka with Greg Zeschuk as creative officer. By November, EA announced a restructuring that would lay off 1500 employees across several offices, which included most of the new BioWare Mythic game division. Leadership at BioWare began to lose optimism under EA's corporate culture and operations, with Oster describing decisions that were "arbitrary" and budget cuts that were "not very smart".

As the release of fantasy role-playing game Dragon Age: Origins was delayed, a trailer for the game caused a stir with its graphic depictions of violence and sexuality, positioning the title as a mature title for mature audiences. The game was released in November 2009, selling more than 3.2 million units and 1 million downloadable content packs by February. The game received several accolades, with multiple publications ranking it among the greatest video games ever made. While executive producer Mark Darrah had hoped the game would become the first in a series, the success of the launch still came as a surprise to BioWare. The team continued to support the game with expansions and downloadable content such as The Stone Prisoner, Warden's Keep, Return to Ostagar, Awakening, The Darkspawn Chronicles, Leliana's Song, The Golems of Amgarrak, and Witch Hunt.

=== 2010 – 2012: Sequels and changes under EA ===
In January 2010, BioWare released Mass Effect 2. The game received numerous year-end awards, including Game of the Year at the 14th Annual Interactive Achievement Awards and Best Game at the 7th British Academy Games Awards. Multiple publications also regard Mass Effect 2 as one of the best video games of all time, with praise for its deeper focus on non-player companion characters and their subplots. The game sold more than 2 million copies in its first month, eventually leading to over seven million units sold between the first two games. Zeschuk noted that BioWare had always considered making sequels to successful games, and were able to do so by diversifying from licensed games to new original properties.

As Electronic Arts pushed for annual releases from their studios, the aggressive deadlines created issues that rippled across BioWare's productions in the years that followed. Four months into development of Dragon Age II, Electronic Arts asked BioWare to quickly release a game within the next fiscal year, due to the delays in Star Wars: The Old Republic. This led to the game's release date moved up within the next fiscal year, with only 16 months total development time. Writer David Gaider recalls making drastic cuts in order to meet the deadline. In December 2010, EA president Frank Gibeau also announced that single player games did not fit the publisher's strategy, leading Ray Muzyka to discuss how future games might include multiplayer elements.

In March 2011, the release of Dragon Age II for its re-use of environments, leading Electronic Arts to issue a statement that they would take fan feedback into consideration. The release also garnered criticism over the inclusion of companions who could be romanced by either gender, leading to a response from David Gaider. Critics directed death threats towards writer Jennifer Hepler. A browser-based game Dragon Age Legends was released on the Facebook platform as a tie-in, and its early launch interest tapered off quickly.

Under the leadership of John Riccitiello as CEO, EA continued their strategy of transforming its intellectual properties into "year-round business[es]", while Gibeau was promoted to head of EA's new restructured operations under four labels: EA Games, EA Sports, EA Play and BioWare. EA announced they would establish a BioWare operation in Galway, Ireland, focused on extending their customer service to Europe. After EA2D's work on Dragon Age Legends and a 2D Mirror's Edge game, EA rebranded the studio BioWare San Francisco, and re-branded their acquisiton of KlickNation as BioWare Social. EA had Victory Games working on a new game in the Command & Conquer series, while also renaming the studio to BioWare Victory. EA shut down both BioWare San Francisco and BioWare Victory just over a year later, as BioWare Mythic reverted to its original brand before also shutting down.

Star Wars: The Old Republic was released in December 2011, making history as the most costly game ever made with a budget of more than $200 million. The game continued to generate revenue for years to come, generating over $1 billion in revenue over the decade that followed. The game was considered the best of the year by MSNBC. The game was also criticized by the Daily Mail for what it referred to as "female sex slaves", referring to the ability to punish a non-player character with a shock collar. Drew Karpyshyn left BioWare soon after reaching this milestone, ending his longtime role as writer that included credits on Baldur's Gate II, Knights of the Old Republic, and the first two Mass Effect games. Drew Karpyshyn returned after a few years, resuming his role as writer on The Old Republic.

The studio entered 2012 with the release Mass Effect 3 in March. The game sold more than 3 million copies and earned further game of the year awards for the studio. However, players generated criticism and controversy surrounding the game's ending sequence, leading BioWare to announce on 5 April that it would reschedule its post-release content with the faster release of an "Extended Cut". The Extended Cut DLC was released as a free download on 26 June 2012, leading some players to feel more satisfied with others still remaining critical. Several commentators and industry peers reacted that changing the ending in response to angry fans would set a bad precedent in the industry. Years later, multiple publication recall it as a turning point where game studios began to give into fan backlash.

By this time, Electronic Arts was seeing more success with multiplayer games featuring microtransactions and free-to-play mechanics, which led Mass Effect 3 to expand with a multiplayer mode and a related mobile phone app. Frank Gibeau proclaimed, "[w]e are very proud of the way EA evolved with consumers. I have not green lit one game to be developed as a single-player experience." BioWare Executive producer Mark Darrah recalls this as a turning point where their publisher had "an active disdain for single-player games". In both 2012 and 2013, Electronic Arts was named the worst company in America according to non-profit The Consumerist, with feedback criticizing release issues with Mass Effect 3 among other titles from the publisher, as well as their evolving monetization practices.

As BioWare began planning the future of the Dragon Age series, the team ended post-release development for Dragon Age II in early 2012. For the next title, the team intended to follow the Mass Effect series in adding multiplayer to the template, in addition to a mandate from Electronic Arts to create an open world game. BioWare announced the third Dragon Age title in September 2012. One month later, co-founders Ray Muzyka and Greg Zeschuk simultaneously announced they would be retiring from the gaming industry.

=== 2013 – 2017: Re-organization, engine challenges, and multiplayer pivot ===
After the departure of its co-founders, the three BioWare studios across Austin, Edmonton, and Montreal spent much of 2013 without a single chief executive. EA promoted an experienced esports CEO named Matthew Bromberg to group general manager, with his prior position leading their Austin studio filled by Jeff Hickman, while BioWare Montreal and Edmonton remained under the leadership Aaryn Flynn. Electronic Arts also acquired an exclusive license from Disney to make more Star Wars games in May 2013, based on BioWare's history with prior Star Wars titles.

Development of Dragon Age: Inquisition faced technical challenges, forcing them to reduce the scope of the project. EA urged several studios to switch to its Frostbite Engine as a cost-cutting measure across their operations, showcasing the graphical fidelity and multiplayer features seen in the Battlefield game series produced by EA DICE. The engine was built for multiplayer first-person shooters, and BioWare worked to expand its support for saved games, experience points, character levels, dialogue systems, bipedal creatures, a real-time with pause combat system, and other features seen in past BioWare role-playing games. EA also became worried that the popularity of mobile gaming would hinder sales of new consoles, forcing BioWare to support last-generation consoles. This meant that the challenges of creating a fully open world role-playing game did not become apparent until a more playable version of the game was complete. As BioWare began to consolidate its multiple teams around a single production, BioWare spent the last few months of development in a continuous crunch while cutting back content to meet deadlines. The Frostbite Engine began to create problems across all of EA's studios, including work on the next Mass Effect, which was announced in late 2013.

Dragon Age: Inquisition was released in November 2014, after spending tens of millions of dollars and four years in development under more than 200 contributors. The team was determined to prove that they could thrive without its original founders, and Aaryn Flynn described wanting to "avoid the apocryphal stories of EA crushing every other studio it buys". Muzyka commented that it was the first BioWare game he hadn't played before its launch, calling it the best work the studio has ever done. The game became BioWare's best selling release with over 12 million copies sold, also earning game of the year awards from IGN, Ars Technica, Game Informer, Polygon, and Electronic Gaming Monthly. However, many team members felt burnt out by the arduous development process, and felt in hindsight that this success may have set a bad precedent for future productions and working conditions.

Meanwhile, Casey Hudson responded to the strategic shift of Electronic Arts towards multiplayer and free-to-play monetization by pitching a new intellectual property that could still utilize the storytelling experience of his team. Internally, BioWare Edmonton referred to this venture into live service gaming under the codename Dylan, aspiring to leave a legacy as impactful as Bob Dylan the singer-songwriter. The longer term plan was to release the game under the title Beyond, before finding its final title as Anthem. While Hudson focused on leading this new production, BioWare Montreal was assigned responsibilities for a new entry in the Mass Effect series with Hudson staying on as executive producer. Pre-production began on the Mass Effect spin-off in 2013, announced in 2014. BioWare also announced a new episodic multiplayer role-playing game called Shadow Realms at Gamescom 2014, but its development was cancelled by the following year.

Casey Hudson left the company in May 2014. As support for Inquisition wrapped up in 2015, a small team began to work on early concepts for a fourth Dragon Age game, codenamed Joplin. David Gaider was soon pulled from his role on the Dragon Age series to help with Dylan, but encountered resistance to his ideas due to the live service game's intended tone and setting. This was a factor that led to him leaving BioWare in January 2016, following the departures of other writers and developers across the studios. Meanwhile, Mass Effect: Andromeda announced in mid-2015, featuring exploration sequences that evoked the Mako sequences from the first Mass Effect game. Internally, the pre-production was facing challenges with EA's Frostbite Engine, including difficulties integrating facial animations created by outsourcing studios. Mac Walters was reassigned from his work on Joplin in to serve as creative director. The team prototyped mechanisms for exploring procedurally generated planets similar to the yet-unreleased No Man's Sky, but pivoted to hand-crafted worlds after production had already started. Much of the game's production was completed in a year-and-a-half crunch across BioWare's multiple studios, with major story and content already locked due to dependencies on external animation companies. On 13 September 2016, EA expanded Samantha Ryan's role leading EA Mobile and Maxis to include BioWare Studios, becoming head of a newly formed group called EA Worldwide Studios.

Mass Effect: Andromeda became the center of controversy even before the game was officially launched, entering early access with glitches that led to criticism and harassment against its developers. Its March 2017 release was met with a polarized reception. The game generated an estimated revenue of over $110 million or 2.5 million sales, becoming the second highest launch for the series after Mass Effect 3. The game did not meet EA's expectations, following the trend of the publisher's non-sports titles lagging behind the commercial performance of sports series such as FIFA. In May 2017, the publisher froze development future Mass Effect games, downgrading the BioWare Montréal branch to a support team, and merging it into Motive Studios in August.

=== 2017 – 2020: Live service focus, development hell, and departures ===
As the rest of BioWare worked on the new live service role-playing game still codenamed Dylan, many staff were often reallocated to assist with production on FIFA. Meanwhile, pre-production on Dylan faced challenges using EA's Frostbite engine to prototype new features, and meeting the technical demands of a vast open world. This made it difficult to establish a shared vision for what the game would be. EA re-prioritized Dylan's development by scaling back work on Joplin, the fourth Dragon Age game.

As staff from Andromeda joined the Dylan team, they made a new demo to show EA president Patrick Soderland, who reacted positively to flying gameplay being re-added after its previous removal. Just before revealing the new live service shooter at EA's pre-E3 press conference in June 2017, the game was retitled Anthem due to EA's difficulty securing the trademark for their initially planned title, Beyond. In July 2017, BioWare general manager Aaryn Flynn announced that he would depart from the company, as Hudson returned to replace him.

As EA shifted BioWare's focus almost exclusively to Anthem, the publisher cancelled work on Dragon Age 4, and asked a new team to reinvent the sequel as a live service game. The game's creative director Mike Laidlaw shared EA's decision with his team in October 2017, noting his disagreement and decision to leave BioWare after his fourteen year tenure. Laidlaw presented a few bottles of whiskey, and the team spent the rest of the evening drinking and reminiscing about the series. Publicly, a teaser trailer for a fourth Dragon Age game was revealed in late 2018. Meanwhile, staff from BioWare Austin working on The Old Republic were re-allocated to Anthem to utilize their experience working on massively multiplayer games, but conflicted with the creative ownership of the BioWare Edmonton team. This also included Drew Karpyshyn who had recently returned as a writer, but he left BioWare once again by 2018. A few months later, James Ohlen left the studio after serving for 22 years as lead designer on the Baldur's Gate series, Neverwinter Nights, Knights of the Old Republic, Jade Empire, and Dragon Age: Origins, also ending his role as the director for The Old Republic. In 2019, The Old Republic reached lifetime revenue of over $1 billion dollars.

After years in development hell, Anthem entered full production in a 16 month crunch period before its launch in February 2019. The game received "mixed or average reviews" upon its release, according to review aggregator Metacritic. SuperData reported that the game had earned over $100 million in its first month, failing to meet EA's revenue expectations. Later that year, BioWare Edmonton moved its 300 employees from their previous offices on Calgary Trail into three stories of the Epcor Tower, until they were forced to work from home due to the Covid-19 pandemic.

During the COVID-19 lockdowns, Mark Darrah retired from his role as executive producer, while Casey Hudson retired from his role as general manager, their respective roles filled by Christian Dailey and Gary McKay. Samantha Ryan at Electronic Arts continued to oversee BioWare, Matthew Goldman continued as creative director for Dragon Age, and Mike Gamble continued to direct the Mass Effect series. BioWare announced that the first three Mass Effect games were being re-mastered into a compilation in late 2020, leading into a teaser trailer for a fifth Mass Effect game shown at The Game Awards. Meanwhile, BioWare continued its work on The Old Republic while working on an overhaul to Anthem, nicknamed Anthem Next.

=== 2021 – 2026: Dragon Age re-reset, downsizing, and closure ===
After resetting production as a live service game, the fourth Dragon Age was reset again, removing its planned multiplayer features. In early 2021, BioWare's general manager met with EA, noting the challenges for Anthem and commercial success of Star Wars Jedi: Fallen Order as a single-player game. As a 30 people began working on Anthem Next to revive the game's fortunes, EA decided to review the project to determine whether to commit to full production, deciding instead to cancel it. EA allowed Dragon Age 4 to be re-imagined again as a single-player title, giving the team a year-and-a-half to complete its production, which limited how much they could still change. Early playtesters on the new Dragon Age felt that the game lacked the choice and consequence of previous BioWare titles, but any re-design was constrained by the project's cancelled multiplayer foundation.

Mass Effect: Legendary Edition was released across PC and consoles on 14 May 2021. The re-master received generally favorable reviews across publications. EA announced that the launch led to a "sales performance well above our expectations", with most of the publisher's revenue still coming from mobile, sports, and live service games. The publisher's losses for 2021 were offset by the success of FIFA and Apex Legends, production on the next Dragon Age continued as a single player project. The fan response to the Mass Effect re-master led EA to announce its continued investment in the series, including early negotiations with Amazon for a television adaptation later that year.

After years of teaser announcements about the next Dragon Age, its official title was announced as Dragon Age: Dreadwolf in summer of 2022. By 2023, EA transferred production of The Old Republic to Broadsword Online, an external third-party studio headed by former BioWare VP Rob Denton. This allowed BioWare to focus its efforts on new games in the Mass Effect and Dragon Age series, but the latter project soon experienced layoffs after further delays. Among those laid off included Lukas Kristjanson, the lead writer behind Baldur's Gate 1 and 2, and the writer of the first three Dragon Age games, and Mary Kirby the character designer for the Mass Effect franchise. Around 50 BioWare developers were laid off in total, including many developers for Dreadwolf. In October, several terminated developers sued their former employer, seeking fair severance and punitive damages for their treatment by EA and BioWare. The pre-production team on the next Mass Effect was reassigned to support Veilguard, with EA also bringing in additional support from Motive Studio in Montreal. The Mass Effect contributors attempted to revise the story with more serious choices and dialog, but could only make so many changes due to the game's prior multiplayer direction and the ongoing SAG-AFTRA video game strike.

Promotions for the fourth Dragon Age began again in June 2024, with its new title revealed as Dragon Age: The Veilguard. The game was released on 31 October 2024, receiving "generally favorable" reviews from critics according to the review aggregator website Metacritic. After Veilguard expanded on the transgender themes first explored in Inquisition, the game was review bombed by users for being "'woke,' 'DEI,' 'propaganda,' and 'agenda-driven'" on Metacritic, leading their moderation team to remove abusive reviews that violated its terms of service. By the end of the year, the game had engaged 1.5 million players, breaking BioWare's concurrent player record on Steam, and becoming one of EA's best single-player launches on the platform. In January 2025, EA lowered its upcoming annual revenue forecast due to the underperformance of several games, including EA Sports FC 25 and Veilguard. As head of EA, Andrew Wilson stated that Veilguard had underperformed the publisher's expectations by half, promising to reallocate resource to games with "shared world" features to meet evolving audience tastes.

At the start of 2025, Electronic Arts laid off approximately 50 people at BioWare, reducing its team to less than 100, down from more than 200 two years prior. Other team members were reallocated to various EA subsidiaries, with a small team remaining to focus work on the next Mass Effect game. The studio had already its entire workforce to the new Mass Effect after the release of Veilguard, leading into an announcement that Amazon MGM Studios was officially producing a Mass Effect television series with Michael Gamble as an executive producer. In June 2025, Electronic Arts announced it would shut down servers for Anthem that coming January.

In September 2025, Electronic Arts announced that it was being acquired. The leveraged buyout of Electronic Arts was led by Saudi Arabia's Public Investment Fund and Jared Kushner's private equity firm Affinity Partners. At a value of $55 billion dollars, the leveraged buyout was partially funded by $20 billion in debt provided by JPMorgan Chase, which created pressures to reduce costs. In November, Mike Gamble assured the audience that both EA and BioWare were committed to telling more stories in the Mass Effect universe. After the acquisition deal closed in August 2026, 400 people were laid off across EA's studios by October, including Maxis, Full Circle, Motive, Respawn, and Ripple Effect, and BioWare. BioWare announced that the studio was to be closed, with its work on an upcoming Mass Effect game cancelled. According to Jason Schreier of Bloomberg News in speaking to those familiar with the matter, after the acquisition, EA evaluated its portfolio and saw two games on its upcoming roster set to cost more than $100 million to complete, the next Mass Effect game and the next Star Wars: Battlefront game, the latter which was seen as a more predictable product. Coupled with poor reception of Bioware's most recent games, and with Dragon Age: The Veilguard missing its sales target by 50%, EA opted to close BioWare, letting go of the approximately 50 staff left in the studio.

== Technology ==
Between 1998 and 2011, BioWare developed a number of in-house video game engines to serve as technical basis for their games. Some of these engines were then licensed to other companies to develop their own games. Others came with modding toolkits, allowing the fan community to implement original adventures using the technology of BioWare's games.

BioWare created the Infinity Engine to use it as a core component for development of the Baldur's Gate series (1998–2001), which were 2D role-playing video games based on Dungeons & Dragons. The engine was also used by Black Isle Studios to create the critically acclaimed Planescape: Torment (1999) and the Icewind Dale series (2000–2002). When Beamdog sought out a license from BioWare and started engineering enhanced versions of these games in 2012, they created an updated version of the Infinity Engine, referred to as the "Infinity Enhanced Engine", alternatively Infinity Plus Engine or Infinity Bless Engine.

The Aurora Engine was the successor to the Infinity Engine, featuring full 3D environments, real-time lighting and shadows, and surround sound. BioWare used the Aurora Engine to produce its 2002 Neverwinter Nights, and two expansion packs. The game included the Aurora toolset, a collection of tools allowing users to create their own digital adventure modules to be played either in single-player or in online multiplayer. The toolset enjoyed great popularity among the modding community, with over a thousand fan-made modules produced in it within half a year after the release.

Obsidian Entertainment, successor to Black Isle Studios), used an updated version of BioWare's Aurora, titled "Electron Engine", to produce Neverwinter Nights 2 (2006) and its three expansion packs (2007–2009). Like the original, the Electron toolset was released with the game. The Polish studio CD Projekt Red used the Aurora Engine to develop The Witcher, the 2007 video game adaptation of the Polish fantasy novel series, although the rendering module was rewritten from scratch.

In 2003, BioWare used an updated version of the Aurora, titled the Odyssey Engine, to produce Star Wars: Knights of the Old Republic and its first original intellectual property role-playing game Jade Empire in 2005. The Odyssey Engine was the first BioWare engine to allow developing for video game consoles, with both Knights of the Old Republic and Jade Empire originally released for the Xbox before being ported to the PC platform. Obsidian Entertainment used the Odyssey Engine to develop Star Wars Knights of the Old Republic II: The Sith Lords (2004), a sequel to the original Knights of the Old Republic. BioWare maintained limited oversight on Obsidian's development of The Sith Lords, as well as Neverwinter Nights 2.

The Eclipse Engine succeeded the Odyssey Engine and, among other things, supported PhysX hardware acceleration. It was used to produce Dragon Age: Origins (2009) and its expansion pack Awakening (2010). Like Neverwinter Nights, Origins was released with a toolset to allow the players to run their own adventure modules on the Eclipse Engine. An upgraded version of the Eclipse Engine, internally known as the Lycium Engine, was used to produce Dragon Age II (2011).

In September 2004, BioWare acquired a license to use Unreal Engine 3 from developer Epic Games. Unreal Engine 3 would ultimately be used to develop the original Mass Effect trilogy (2007–2012), as well as the remastered Mass Effect: Legendary Edition in 2021.

In 2013, EA confirmed that all future games developed by BioWare would be made on DICE's Frostbite engine. All of BioWare's games since the confirmation (Dragon Age: Inquisition, Mass Effect: Andromeda, Anthem, and Dragon Age: The Veilguard) were developed using Frostbite 3 as part of the general move towards a unified technology foundation across all of Electronic Arts' development studios. This policy was later dropped in 2023.

== Subsidiaries ==
- BioWare Austin in Austin, Texas; formed in March 2006 specifically to develop Star Wars: The Old Republic (with assistance from BioWare Edmonton), BioWare Austin later began working on a new IP called Shadow Realms, but production was shelved in February 2015 in order to focus on the continuing production of Dragon Age: Inquisition and The Old Republic. On 27 June 2023, BioWare announced that its Austin branch handed SWTOR off to Broadsword Online Games to work on the next Dragon Age and Mass Effect installments with the Edmonton studio.
- BioWare Montreal in Montreal, Quebec; formed in March 2009 to assist the Edmonton studio where necessary. Led the development of DLC for the Mass Effect series as well as Mass Effect: Andromeda. BioWare Montreal was merged with EA's Motive Studio in August 2017.
- BioWare Mythic in Fairfax, Virginia; formerly known as Mythic Entertainment, until June 2009, re-renamed to Mythic Entertainment in November 2012 and closed completely in 2014.
- BioWare Sacramento in Sacramento, California; founded as KlickNation 2008, acquired and renamed BioWare Sacramento in 2011, and renamed EA Capital Games in 2014.
- BioWare San Francisco in San Francisco, California; founded as EA2D and developed Mirror's Edge 2D and Dragon Age: Legends, became part of BioWare, but was closed in February 2013.
- Victory Games in Los Angeles, California; founded in February 2011 as BioWare Victory to develop the 2013 Command & Conquer, it had since dropped the BioWare label in November 2012 but remained part of the BioWare group. The studio dissolved in October 2013.
- Waystone Games in Redwood City, California; the developer of Dawngate, which was cancelled in November 2014.

== Games developed ==
List of BioWare video games
Year	Title	Platform(s)
1996	Shattered Steel	DOS, Mac OS, Windows
1998	Baldur's Gate	Mac OS, Windows
2000	MDK2	Dreamcast, PlayStation 2, Wii, Windows
2000	Baldur's Gate II: Shadows of Amn	Mac OS, Windows
2002	Neverwinter Nights	Linux, Mac OS X, Windows
2003	Star Wars: Knights of the Old Republic	Android, iOS, Mac OS X, Windows, Xbox
2005	Jade Empire	Android, iOS, Mac OS X, Windows, Xbox
2007	Mass Effect	PlayStation 3, Windows, Xbox 360
2008	Sonic Chronicles: The Dark Brotherhood	Nintendo DS
2009	Mass Effect Galaxy	iOS
2009	Dragon Age: Origins	Mac OS X, PlayStation 3, Windows, Xbox 360
2010	Mass Effect 2	PlayStation 3, Windows, Xbox 360
2011	Dragon Age II	Mac OS X, PlayStation 3, Windows, Xbox 360
2011	Dragon Age Legends	Facebook, Google+
2011	Star Wars: The Old Republic	Windows
2012	Mass Effect 3	PlayStation 3, Wii U, Windows, Xbox 360
2014	Dragon Age: Inquisition	PlayStation 3, PlayStation 4, Windows, Xbox 360, Xbox One
2017	Mass Effect: Andromeda	PlayStation 4, Windows, Xbox One
2019	Anthem	PlayStation 4, Windows, Xbox One
2021	Mass Effect Legendary Edition	PlayStation 4, Windows, Xbox One
2024	Dragon Age: The Veilguard	PlayStation 5, Windows, Xbox Series X/S

== Awards and recognition ==
The full list of awards can be found on its web site.

- Spike TV's 2010 Video Game Awards: Studio of the Year (2010)
- Hall of Fame induction (2010)

In addition to numerous game awards, in October 2008, the company was named one of Alberta's Top Employers by Mediacorp Canada Inc., which was announced by the Calgary Herald and the Edmonton Journal.

BioWare's co-founders Ray Muzyka and Greg Zeschuk were named as members of the Order of Canada in December 2018 "for [their] revolutionary contributions to the video game industry as a developer and co-founder of an internationally renowned studio."
