= Options backdating =

Altering a stock option's date of granting to a time when the stock was less valuable

In finance, options backdating is the practice of altering the date a stock option was granted, to a usually earlier date (i.e backdating), but sometimes later date (i.e. forward dating), at which the underlying stock price was lower. This is a way of repricing options to make them more valuable when the option "strike price" (the fixed price at which the owner of the option can purchase stock) is fixed to the stock price at the date the option was granted. Cases of backdating employee stock options have drawn public and media attention.

Stock options are often granted to the upper management of a corporation. While options backdating is not always illegal, it has been called "cheating the corporation in order to give the CEO more money than was authorized." According to a study by Erik Lie, a finance professor at the University of Iowa, more than 2,000 companies used options backdating in some form to reward their senior executives between 1996 and 2002. In an "uncanny number of cases," the "companies granted stock options to executives right before a sharp increase in their stocks."

To be legal, backdating must be clearly communicated to the company shareholders, properly reflected in earnings, and properly reflected in tax calculations.

The U.S. Securities and Exchange Commission’s opinions regarding backdating and fraud were primarily due to the various tax rules that apply when issuing “in the money” stock options versus the much different – and more financially beneficial – tax rules that apply when issuing “at the money” or "out of the money" stock options. Additionally, companies can use backdating to produce greater executive incomes without having to report higher expenses to their shareholders, which can lower company earnings and/or cause the company to fall short of earnings predictions and public expectations. Corporations, however, have defended the practice of stock option backdating with their legal right to issue options that are already in the money as they see fit, as well as the frequent occurrence in which a lengthy approval process is required.

== History ==
In 1972, a new revision (APB 25) in accounting rules resulted in the ability of any company to avoid having to report executive incomes as an expense to their if the income resulted from an issuance of “at the money” stock options. In essence, the revision enabled companies to increase executive compensation without informing their shareholders if the compensation was in the form of stock options contracts that would only become valuable if the underlying stock price were to increase at a later time.

In 1994, a new tax code (162 M) provision declared all executive income levels over one million dollars to be “unreasonable” in order to increase taxes on all applicable salaries by removing them from their previous tax-deductible status. To avoid having to pay higher taxes, many companies adopted a policy of issuing “at the money” stock options in lieu of additional income, with the idea that the executive or employee would benefit through the option by working to increase the value of the company without exceeding the one million dollar deductibility cap for executive income.

When company executives discovered that they had the ability to backdate stock option grants, thus making them both tax deductible and “in the money” on the date of actual issuance, the common practice of stock option backdating for financial gain began on a widespread level. The problem with this practice, according to the SEC, was that stock option backdating, while difficult to prove, could be considered a criminal act.

One of the larger backdating scandals occurred at Brocade Communications, a data storage company. It was forced to restate earnings by recognizing a stock-based expense increase of $723 million between 1999 and 2004, after allegedly manipulating its stock options grants for the benefit of its senior executives. It allegedly failed to inform investors, or account for the options expense(s) properly.

== Terminology ==
- bullet dodging – delaying an options grant until just after bad earnings news that drives down share prices.
- spring-loading – timing an options grant to precede good news that will drive up share prices.
- symmetric spring-loading – where members of the board who approve the grant are aware of the forthcoming good news.
- asymmetric spring-loading – where members of the board who approve the grant are unaware of the forthcoming good news.

== Implications in corporate America ==
Since the advent of stock option backdating, corporate policies have moved first toward a posture of encouraging backdating as a standard business practice, but then toward a posture of avoidance as public scandals emerged and investigations into fraudulent or dishonest business practices increased despite a commonly held belief that backdating was an acceptable and legal practice. In the modern business world, the Sarbanes–Oxley Act has all but eliminated fraudulent options backdating by requiring companies to report all options issuances within 2 days of the date of issue.

Options backdating may still occur under the new reporting regulations, but Sarbanes–Oxley compliant backdating is far less likely to be used for dishonest reasons due to the short time frame that is allowed for reporting. As a result, numerous companies are conducting internal investigations to determine if, when, and how backdating occurred, and are filing amended earnings statements and tax forms to show the issuance of “in the money” options in place of the “at the money” options that were previously reported.

== Negative public perception ==
While it is true that many forms of backdating are not fraudulent or criminal in nature, there is a largely prevalent public opinion that all forms of backdating are the equivalent of fraud. This is not always the case, according to a ruling by federal judge William Alsup of the U.S. District Court for the Northern District of California. According to Alsup’s reasoning and subsequent ruling, it is improper to infer fraudulent activity based solely on the occurrence of options backdating – further facts must be present and proven before the act can be considered to be fraudulent.

Another public perception is that options backdating stems from executive corruption. While this conclusion is logical in cases of options backdating in which executives knowingly participated in the criminal actions, options backdating can be a result of normal accounting or corporate policies that are not criminal in nature, and is a legal practice as long as the backdated contract is appropriately reported for tax purposes.

== Overview of options backdating scandals ==
Academic researchers had long been aware of the pattern, exhibited by some companies, of share prices rising dramatically in the days following grants of stock options to senior management. However, in late 2005 and early 2006, the issue of stock options backdating gained a wider audience. Numerous financial analysts replicated and expanded upon the prior academic research, developing lists of companies whose stock price performance immediately after options grants to senior management (the purported dates of which can be ascertained by inspecting a company's Form 4 filings, generally available online at the SEC's website) was suspicious.

For instance, public companies generally grant stock options in accordance with a formal stock option plan approved by shareholders at an annual meeting. Many companies' stock option plans provide that stock options must be granted at an exercise price no lower than fair market value on the date of the option grant. If a company grants options on June 1 (when the stock price is $100), but backdates the options to May 15 (when the price was $80) in order to make the option grants more favorable to the grantees, the fact remains that the grants were actually made on June 1, and if the exercise price of the granted options is $80, not $100, it is below fair market value. Thus, backdating can be misleading to shareholders in the sense that it results in option grants that are more favorable than the shareholders approved in adopting the stock option plan.

The other major way that backdating can be misleading to investors relates to the method by which the company accounts for the options. Until very recently, a company that granted stock options to executives at fair market value did not have to recognize the cost of the options as a compensation expense. However, if the company granted options with an exercise price below fair market value, there would be a compensation expense that had to be recognized under applicable accounting rules. If a company backdated its stock options, but failed to recognize a compensation expense, then the company's accounting may not be correct, and its quarterly and annual financial reports to investors may be misleading.

Although many companies have been identified as having problems with backdating, the severity of the problem, and the consequences, fall along a broad spectrum. At one extreme, where it is clear that top management was guilty of conscious wrongdoing in backdating, attempted to conceal the backdating by falsifying documents, and where the backdating resulted in a substantial overstatement of the company's profitability, SEC enforcement actions and even criminal charges have resulted. Toward the other extreme, where the backdating was a result of overly informal internal procedures or even just delays in finalizing the paperwork documenting options grants, not intentional wrongdoing, there is likely to be no formal sanction—although the company may have to restate its financial statements to bring its accounting into compliance with applicable accounting rules.

With respect to the more serious cases of backdating, it is likely that most of the criminal actions that the government intended to bring were brought in 2007. There is a five-year statute of limitations for securities fraud, and under the Sarbanes–Oxley Act of 2002, option grants to senior management must be reported within two days of the grant date. This all but eliminated the opportunity for senior management to engage any meaningful options backdating. Therefore, any criminal prosecution is likely to be based on option grants made before Sarbanes–Oxley took effect, and the deadline facing the government for bringing those prosecutions has already passed.

As of 17 November 2006, backdating has been identified at more than 130 companies, and led to the firing or resignation of more than 50 top executives and directors of those companies. Notable companies embroiled in the scandal include Broadcom Corp., UnitedHealth Group, and Comverse Technology.

Some of the more prominent corporate figures involved in the controversy currently are Steve Jobs and Michael Dell. Both Apple and Dell were under SEC investigation. On April 24, 2007, the SEC announced it would not file charges against Apple and Jobs, but had filed charges against former Apple chief financial officer Fred D. Anderson and former Apple general counsel Nancy R. Heinen for their alleged roles in backdating Apple options. Anderson immediately settled the charges for a payment of a civil penalty of $150,000 and disgorgement of "ill-gotten gains" of approximately $3.49 million. Heinen was charged with, among other things, violating the antifraud provisions of the Securities Act of 1933 and the Securities Exchange Act of 1934, lying to Apple's auditors, and violating prohibitions on circumventing internal controls, based on the options awarded to Steve Jobs (dated October 19, 2001 but allegedly granted in December 2001) and also option grants awarded to top company executives, including Heinen (dated January 17, 2001, but allegedly granted in February 2001.) The SEC sought injunctive relief, disgorgement, and money penalties against Heinen, in addition to an order barring her from serving as an officer or director of a public company. On August 14, 2008, the SEC announced a settlement with Heinen for $2.2 million.

== United States income tax issues ==
According to the February 9, 2007 WSJ (Page A3) article IRS Urges Companies to Pay Taxes Owed By Workers Unaware of Backdated Options the government will go after taxpayers on such options but will pursue the company for rank and file employees.

=== Deferral of recognition into employee's gross income ===
According to Section 83 of the Code, employees who receive property from the employer must recognize taxable income in the year in which that property vests (i.e., in the year in which the property becomes free of restrictions and other risks of forfeiture). Stock options granted with an exercise price below the then current fair market value have intrinsic value equal to the difference between the market price and the strike price. Such backdating may be construed as illegally avoiding income recognition because falsely under-reporting the market price of such stocks makes them appear to have no value in excess of the strike price at the time the option is granted.

=== Denial of deduction under Section 162(m) of the tax code ===
The 1993 Clinton tax increase amended the Code to include Section 162(m) which presumptively makes compensation in excess of one million dollars unreasonable for public companies. As the Tax Code allows a corporate deduction only for reasonable compensation to employees, Section 162(m) needed an exception for performance based compensation. According to the September 5, 2006 Joint Committee on Taxation background briefing if the CEO or other top executive gets stock option grants with exercise price equal to market price, then the options granted would be presumed to be reasonable because they would be performance based. However, if the exercise price is below the market price so that the options are in the money, then the compensation will not be performance based, as the options would have intrinsic value immediately. (See page 5 of the background briefing).

As an economic and practical matter, backdating and cherry-picking dates with the lowest market price of the underlying stock may be evidence that the options granted were not reasonable compensation, because the grant of the options would not be performance based. In such a case, tax deductions would be denied.
