= Marc Bodnick =

American entrepreneur and venture capitalist

- Born: Marc Adam Bodnick; 17 May 1969 (age 57)
- Education: Harvard University (BA); Stanford University
- Known for: Co-founding Elevation Partners

Marc Adam Bodnick (born May 17, 1969) is an American entrepreneur and venture capitalist, best known as a co-founder of Elevation Partners.

== Education ==
Bodnick earned a bachelor's degree in government at Harvard University and a master's degree in political science at Stanford University.

== Employment ==
Bodnick is a founding principal of Silver Lake Partners. He also worked at Blackstone Group and Kroll. In 2003, he co-founded Elevation Partners, along with Bono and a number of Silicon Valley investors and executives. As Managing Director, he was credited with reversing the poor performance of the fund's first fund, with a $210 million investment in Facebook and a $100 million investment in Yelp, Inc. His sister-in-law, Sheryl Sandberg, was Chief Operating Officer of Facebook.

=== Quora ===
In early 2011, Bodnick was recruited to lead the business and community team at Quora, a question-and-answer website founded by Adam D'Angelo and Charlie Cheever, after becoming an early beta tester and contributor. In May 2016, he announced that he was leaving his position at Quora.

=== Telepath ===
After leaving Quora, Bodnick co-founded Telepath.com, an interest-based social network. Telepath was in private beta for a time, but the website is no longer available since 2022.
