= Quoran =

Quoran may refer to:

- Alternative spelling of Quran
- Of or relating to Quora
