= Dragon Age Legends =

2011 video game

- Developer: EA2D
- Publisher: Electronic Arts
- Series: Dragon Age
- Platforms: Facebook Platform, Google+
- Release: March 16, 2011: Facebook; WW: March 16, 2011 Google+; WW: August 11, 2011
- Genres: Tactical role-playing, strategy

Dragon Age Legends was a 2011 freemium Flash game developed by EA2D and published by Electronic Arts (EA) for Facebook and Google+. Set in the Dragon Age universe, Legends was developed as the successor to the 2009 Flash-based browser game Dragon Age Journeys and served as a tie-in to the 2011 main series game Dragon Age II. Released on March 16, 2011, for Facebook and August 11, 2011, for Google+, Dragon Age Legends generated significant media coverage and its promotional campaign attracted substantial "likes" on social media, but the game itself was ultimately not a commercial success. By June 18, 2012, the servers for Legends were decommissioned by EA, although an altered version of the game was made available as a free download for offline play.

== Premise ==
Dragon Age Legends was set in Kaiten, a city-state located in the same region as Dragon Age II, the Free Marches. It plot runs parallel to that of Dragon Age II and is considered to be part of the Dragon Age universe's canon. The player assumed the role of an ally of Ravi, the Viscount of Kaiten, who beseeches the player character to help save his son Eiton from danger. Ravi became the ruler of Kaiten after he vanquished his demon-possessed uncle Khedra 13 years before the events of Legends.

== Gameplay ==
In this gameplay screenshot, the player's party is fighting enemy creatures known as Darkspawn. A dragon-like winged beast called a drake is also present on the battlefield.

At the commencement of Legends, players were prompted to create their own character, with customizable gender, appearance and name along with the choice of warrior, rogue or mage as character class. Players could zoom in from the world map and view the road near the top of the screen that represents their mission progress. Walking along the path takes their character from one node to the next: each node represents a point of potential conflict, and visiting the next node costs a predetermined number of energy points, though the player's store of energy will recover over time. Combat scenarios were turn-based and dependent on agility statistics, with two opposing squads of fighting characters lined up against each other. Players may target enemy units with a variety of different attacks, although special moves require the expenditure of mana. Player characters may consume potions to recover hit points. The end of each battle yields in-game currency and item rewards such as armor and weapons which can be equipped in the inventory menu. The abilities of the player character may be improved through their skill tree, which was advanced by the character's level progression.

Players were encouraged to recruit characters into their party during combat. The bottom of the screen contains a list of potential characters who can be recruited by the player: some were non-player characters generated within the game, while others were avatar characters of the player's friends on Facebook. At the conclusion of the battle, players must wait a certain amount of time before characters who had just participated in battle could be carried over into the next one. To circumvent the limitations on waiting time, players were able to spend money to purchase in-game currency called "Crowns"; in the alternative, the player had the option to invite more Facebook friends to play Legends together. Unlike standard multiplayer games, there was no element of playing together: displayed avatar characters who represent the player's Facebook friends were not actually player-controlled, but simply have their statistics and personas imported into the player's game. Players can compose a party of up to six characters, though the actual number of characters which could be recruited at any given time was dependent on the individual player's level of advancement.

Other gameplay features in Legends included a store where items were purchased or sold, and written codex entries which provided exposition on series lore. Players also managed a base of operations named Kaiten Castle, where additional rooms such as a worker's quarters or an apothecary for the crafting of options could be built or upgraded. Players were also expected to keep track and manage the happiness rating of the castle's inhabitants.

== Development and release ==
Legends was developed as a Flash game by a team from EA2D (later reformed as BioWare San Francisco), which was led by video game designers Soren Johnson and Ethan Levy. It was officially announced in November 2010 for a February 2011 release. It was promoted as "companion gaming", or a social glue for friends to "quest, loot, share rewards and grow a kingdom", with a major incentive being the opportunity to unlocking additional content in Dragon Age II by playing Legends.

The game was open to the public for beta testing via registration on its official website shortly after its announcement. A closed beta on Facebook commenced on February 1, 2011. As part of the game's marketing campaign, the game's key art, press releases, and blog posts were promoted on various platforms. EA offered the "BioWare Signature pack" as a tie-in incentive for players who buy and log in to Dragon Age II by March 15, 2011, which granted players Hawke, the player character of Dragon Age II, as a companion, along with other in-game items and exclusive bonuses. Legends officially went live on Facebook on March 16, 2011. In August 2011, the Google+ port for Legends went live. There were no functional differences between both versions, though players were not required to unlock items twice as both were linked to their EA account.

A modified version of the game titled Dragon Age Legends: Remix 01 was released in May 2011 and hosted on IGN. It was co-developed by Levy and Evan Miller, creator of Hunted Forever, using the original assets of Legends. Levy cited the hack and slash video game Bayonetta as an inspiration, and described the game as "fast, fluid fun". It followed another aspect of the backstory of Viscount Ravi, and how he recovered two pieces of equipment from the mythical demon hunter Evra during his youth when he used to be a formidable warrior.

In May 2012 EA announced that the servers for Legends would be turned off by June 18, 2012, with its in-game store shut down a month before the intended end of service, citing insufficient revenue generated by the game to sustain itself. A further announcement by the developers on the official blog of Dragon Age Legends indicated that the game would be released as a free download for players who wish to continue playing. A standalone version of Legends which ran on Adobe Air, with its social media features and purchase of microtransactions removed, was released as a free download following the closure of its servers; players had the option to download their pre-existing characters as a "Saved Game" and continue playing offline.

== Reception ==
Kotaku had recommended Legends as one of the best games to play on the Facebook platform before it updated its list on June 21, 2012, following the deactivation of Legends from the platform. Stephen Totilo from Kotaku enjoyed playing Legends; he initially expressed skepticism that Legends was nothing more than a marketing ploy due to the nature of Facebook games being heavily reliant on promotional efforts through chain letters and word of mouth on social media. Totilo found the overall gameplay experience to be pleasant and was impressed by the amount of gameplay options available. He praised the game's combat as "swift and fun" and felt that its social media elements never became "obnoxious", although he felt that enemy AI was weak. Nicole Tanner from IGN called it "one of the best games on Facebook" at the time of its release.

Conversely, Alec Meer from Rock, Paper, Shotgun was highly critical of Legends, and called it a "modern reworking of the old coin-op side-scrolling beat 'em/shoot 'em ups" which shamelessly made money off customers who are fans of the Dragon Age series. Meer noted that the alternative to not spending real money in Legends were the unnecessarily long wait times. Meer opined that the entirety of Legends was essentially an advertisement one needs to pay to keep watching, and questioned whether "compulsion is the same as legitimately being entertained". Meer concluded that while he was supportive of good quality social games or freemium games, he was overall unimpressed by the gameplay features presented in Legends, which he called a "slovenly, cheating, cynical wolf in RPG's clothing".

In October 2011, Levy disclosed during his Game Developers Conference (GDC) Online talk session that Legends received up to 100,000 Facebook likes and its promotional trailer generated over 100,000 views, but conceded that the attention from both video game journalists and social media was overly optimistic. Levy noted that Legends failed to retain the majority of its "huge early audience" as loyal players, and identified the game's premature launch as a result of the development team's strict adherence to the marketed release date as the main issue, as it was not in a state to support the momentum generated by its promotional efforts. Nevertheless, BioWare San Francisco had considered investing further resources into developing more social gaming projects by August 2011.
