= Nancy R. Heinen =

American lawyer, business executive and philanthropist

- Born: Nancy Regina Heinen
- Education: University of California, Berkeley (PhD), (JD), 1982
- Occupations: Corporate lawyer, corporate executive
- Board member of: VERB; Silicon Valley Social Venture Fund; UC Berkeley Center for Law, Business and the Economy; Embrace; Northern California Innocence Project; Illuminate Ventures; Duarte
- Spouse: Dennis DeBroeck

Nancy Regina Heinen is an American lawyer, business executive and philanthropist. She is known for being the General Counsel, Senior Vice President, and Secretary of Apple Inc from September 1997 to May 2006. Heinen is currently a member of the board of VERB and the Silicon Valley Social Venture Fund. She also serves on the board of directors and advisory boards for several other companies and philanthropic organizations.

== Early life and education ==
Heinen received a Bachelor of Arts in Psychology and English from the University of California, Berkeley, and a Juris Doctor from University of California, Berkeley School of Law in 1982.

== Career ==
=== Early career ===
Heinen began her career as an associate in several San Francisco Bay area law firms. She then worked in the legal department of Tandem Computers and was later hired by Steve Jobs as the general counsel at NeXT. From 1988 to 1993, Heinen was the Secretary of Hewlett Packard Enterprise. While at NeXT, Heinen helped to prepare the company for its initial public offering, and its eventual acquisition by Apple Computer Inc.

=== Apple Computer Inc (1997–2006) ===
After NeXT was purchased by Apple in March 1996, Heinen stayed with the company as General Counsel and secretary. Heinen later became Senior Vice President, General Counsel and Legal Secretary of Apple Computer Inc. She was also on the board of BSA Software Alliance from 1996 to 2005.

Heinen was one of several Apple executives credited with helping to revive Apple after it experienced a financial decline in the 1990s, along with Fred D. Anderson, Mitch Mandich, Jon Rubinstein, and Avie Tevanian. During this time, Apple began pre-emptively applying for patents to prevent them from being obtained by the company's competition, a tactic Heinen described as "a defensive tool". Heinen left Apple on May 1, 2006, after nine years with the company. Neither Heinen nor Apple commented on her departure other than to confirm it. Shortly after she left, she retained two criminal defense lawyers, and Apple admitted to irregularities in its handling of executive stock option dating.

==== SEC allegations ====
On April 24, 2007, the SEC filed a claim against Heinen alleging that she caused Apple to backdate large option grants and altered corporate records to hide the actions. According to the SEC press release, "Heinen is charged with, among other things, violating the antifraud provisions of the Securities Act of 1933 and the Securities Exchange Act of 1934, lying to Apple's auditors, and violating prohibitions on circumventing internal controls" based on options awarded to Steve Jobs which were dated October 19, 2001 but allegedly granted in December 2001, and also option grants awarded to top company executives, including Heinen which were dated January 17, 2001 but allegedly granted in February 2001.

Heinen settled with the SEC on August 14, 2008, agreeing to pay a total of $2.2 million to resolve all of the SEC charges against her, but without either admitting or denying any wrongdoing. Heinen was to return $1.575 million from the stock options that she received, plus interest, and pay a $200,000 penalty. Apple's former CFO Fred D. Anderson had already reached a $3.5 million settlement with the SEC in 2007, without admitting or denying its allegations regarding the stock-option backdating at the technology company. The SEC settlement also barred Heinen from serving as a public company officer or director for five years and barred her from practicing before the SEC for three years. Heinen's settlement ended the civil suit filed in California federal court by the SEC in April 2007 that would otherwise have gone to trial in 2009. A two-year criminal investigation into the matter by the U.S. Justice Department was closed without criminal charges being filed.

=== Post-Apple career ===
After leaving Apple, Heinen became involved in various philanthropic and non-profit organizations, particularly those related to social justice, and economic and educational outreach. In 2009, Heinen joined the board of directors of Silicon Valley Social Ventures. a non-profit founded by Laura Arrillaga-Andreessen. Heinen became vice chair in 2011, and chairman in 2012. She participated in the education grant round and partner advisory board, and served as a co-leader of FY16-17's international grant round.

Heinen is Chair of the Board of Directors for First Place For Youth, a non-profit organization which helps foster youths, and of Teen Success Inc. Heinen has served as a member of the board of several other organizations such as Embrace, the UC Berkeley Center for Law, Business and the Economy, Northern California Innocence Project, Illuminate Ventures, Duarte, and Vitamix. Heinen is also a sponsor of People Acting in Community Together (P.A.C.T).

On December 20, 2019, it was announced that Heinen had joined the board of directors of VERB Technology Company, Inc., a Newport Beach, California based software company.

== Personal life ==
Heinen is married to attorney Dennis DeBroeck, a partner in the corporate group at Fenwick & West law firm, which is counsel to Apple Inc.
