= Imprint (trade name) =

Trade name under which works are published

An imprint of a publisher is a trade name under which it publishes a work. A single publishing company may have multiple imprints, often using the different names as brands to market works to various demographic consumer segments.

== Description ==
An imprint of a publisher is a trade name—a name that a business uses for trading commercial products or services—under which a work is published. Imprints typically have a defining character or mission. In some cases, the diversity results from the takeover of smaller publishers (or parts of their business) by a larger company.

In the video game industry, some game companies operate various publishing labels. Electronic Arts' (EA) 2008 CEO, John Riccitiello, stated that, with the establishment of Rockstar, Take-Two Interactive effectively invented the "label" corporate structure, which EA followed in 2008. This model has influenced rivals including Activision Blizzard, ZeniMax, Electronic Arts from 2008 to 2018, Warner Bros. Interactive, Embracer Group, and Koei Tecmo. Take-Two has had such models in place since 1997–1998. Take-Two is seen as "a game holding company with autonomous game publishing and development subsidiaries". Independently owned game publishers like Devolver Digital also use the word "label" to describe themselves.

== Use ==
A single publishing company may have multiple imprints, with the different imprints often used by the publisher to market works to different demographic consumer segments. For example, the objective of Viking—an imprint of the Penguin Group—is "[t]o publish a strictly limited list of good nonfiction, such as biography, history and works on contemporary affairs, and distinguished fiction with some claim to permanent importance rather than ephemeral popular interest".
