= Entry into force =

Legal terminology

In law, coming into force or entry into force (also called commencement) is the process by which legislation, regulations, treaties and other legal instruments come to have legal force and effect. The term is closely related to the date of this transition. The point at which such instrument comes into effect may be set out in the instrument itself, or after the lapse of a certain period, or upon the happening of a certain event, such as a proclamation or an objective event, such as the birth, marriage, reaching a particular age or death of a certain person. On rare occasions, the effective date of a law may be backdated to a date before the enactment.

To come into force, a treaty or act first needs to receive the required number of votes or ratifications. Although it is common practice to stipulate this number as a requirement in the body of the treaty itself, it can also be set out in a superior law or legal framework, such as a constitution or the standing orders of the legislature in which it originated.

"Coming into force" generally includes publication in an official gazette so that people know the law or treaty exists.

== Treaties ==
After their adoption, treaties as well as their amendments may have to follow the official legal procedures of the organisation, such as the United Nations, that sponsored it, including signature, ratification, and entry into force.

== Legislation ==
The process of enactment, by which a bill becomes an act, is separate from commencement. Even if a bill passes through all necessary stages to become an act, it may not automatically come into force. Moreover, an act may be repealed having never come into force.

A country's law could determine that on being passed by lawmakers a bill becomes an act without further ado. However, more usually, the process whereby a bill becomes an act is well prescribed in general constitutional or administrative legislation. This process varies from country to country, and from political system to political system.

Typically, the process by which a bill becomes an act includes signature or some other token of assent by the head of state and publication in an official gazette. In some systems, the head of state or some other official is required to definitely signify his approval, as for example in the granting of royal assent in the Commonwealth realms. In others, a bill automatically becomes an act unless vetoed, as for example in the United States. But these steps do not, in themselves, make an act legally binding on the population. An act is typically brought into force in one of three ways:

- By means of an explicit commencement date (and sometimes time of day) written into the act itself. It is possible for different sections of an act to come into force at different dates or times.
- As a result of a commencement order. Usually, an act or part of an act may only be brought into force by a commencement order if explicit provision is made. Commencement orders are typically issued by the executive branch of government, though they may also require legislative approval, or at least that the legislature be informed. As with explicit commencement dates, different parts of an act may be brought into force by different commencement orders at different times.
- Automatically. An act that does not include explicit commencement dates or provision for commencement orders, or that has dates or provides for commencement orders for only some of its contents, will typically be interpreted as having come into effect at a certain time relative to its enactment. This time is usually specified by an interpretive statute, or, in the absence of such a statute, a legal rule. For example, in the United Kingdom, until late in the 18th century a legal rule interpreted statutes as coming into effect at the start of the legislative session in which they were passed, but Acts of Parliament (Commencement) Act 1793 (33 Geo. 3. c. 13) stipulated that future laws without explicit commencement provisions would come into effect on the day on which they received royal assent. A similar example is provided by New Zealand, where an act without commencement provisions comes into force on the day after the day on which it received royal assent.
- It is possible for an act to come into effect through any combination of these three methods.

It is not necessarily the case that a statute which comes into force remains in force until it is repealed; it may be explicitly brought out of force, and perhaps later brought back into force. For example, in Ireland, Section V of the Offences against the State Act 1939 (which provides for the Special Criminal Court) goes in and out of force by government proclamation: it was brought into force on 24 August 1939, out of force on 2 October 1962, and back into force on 26 May 1972.

== National practice ==
=== Brazil ===
The Law of Introduction to the Norms of Brazilian Law (Brazilian Portuguese: Lei de Introdução às Normas do Direito Brasileiro) or LINDB establishes, in its first article, that a law enters into force throughout the country forty-five days after its official publication. However, the majority of Brazilian federal and state laws enter into force immediately upon their publication in the respective official gazettes. The LINDB also establishes that laws do not have a fixed term of validity, remaining in effect until another law repeals them.

Since 1988, the Constitution has provided for "provisional measures" (Brazilian Portuguese: medidas provisórias), a legal act in Brazil through which the President can, "in important and urgent cases", enact laws effective for a maximum of 60 days without approval by the National Congress. Upon enacting one, the President is required to immediately submit it to Congress for approval or rejection. The provisional measure may be renewed once for an additional 60 days, after which, it will cease to be in force unless Congress has approved it and made it law.

The former Constitution, enacted in 1967 and extensively amended by the military junta in 1969, provided for "decree-laws" (Brazilian Portuguese: decretos-lei) to be issued by the President "in cases of urgency or significant public interest, and provided there is no increase in expenditure". These, as is the case for provisional measures, would be effective for 60 days until approval by Congress. Until a constitutional amendment in 1982, if the decree-law were not reviewed by Congress within the deadline, it would be deemed approved. All decree-laws were repealed or converted into provisional measures in 1988.

=== Netherlands ===
Since 2007 the government of the Netherlands has been experimenting with common commencement dates for legislation concerned with:

- public health expenses
- education
- environmental matters
- construction of houses and buildings
- financial markets
- taxation.

In these fields, commencement dates must be either 1 January or 1 July.

=== United Kingdom ===
Section 4 of the Interpretation Act 1978 (c. 30) provides:

An Act or provision of an Act comes into force—

(a) where provision is made for it to come into force on a particular day, at the beginning of that day;
(b) where no provision is made for its coming into force, at the beginning of the day on which the Act receives the Royal Assent.

This replaces the corresponding provision in the Acts of Parliament (Commencement) Act 1793 (33 Geo. 3. c. 13).

Schedule 1 of that act contains the following definition:

"Commencement", in relation to an Act or enactment, means the time when the Act or enactment comes into force.

==== Northern Ireland ====
Sections 14(1) and (2) of the Interpretation Act (Northern Ireland) 1954 (c. 33 (N.I.)) read:

(1) Every enactment which is not expressed to come into force or operation on a particular day shall come into operation immediately on the expiration of the day before the date of the passing thereof, or, where the enactment is a statutory instrument, of the making thereof.
(2) Where an enactment is expressed to come into force or operation on a particular day (whether such day is before or after the date of the passing of such enactment, or where the enactment is a statutory instrument, of the making thereof, and whether such day is named in the enactment or is to be appointed or fixed or ascertained in any other manner) the enactment shall be construed as coming into force immediately on the expiration of the day before that particular day.

In an enactment the expression "commencement", when used with reference to any statutory provision, means the time at which that provision comes into operation.

==== Scotland ====
Sections 2 and 3 of the Interpretation and Legislative Reform (Scotland) Act 2010, which applies to acts of the Scottish Parliament and Scottish statutory instruments, provide-

2 Commencement of Acts of the Scottish Parliament
(1) Subsection (2) applies where no provision is made for the coming into force of an Act of the Scottish Parliament.
(2) The Act comes into force at the beginning of the day after the day on which the Bill for the Act receives Royal Assent.

3 Commencement of Acts of the Scottish Parliament and Scottish instruments: time

(1) Subsection (2) applies where an Act of the Scottish Parliament or a Scottish instrument provides for the Act or instrument to come into force on a particular day.
(2) The Act or instrument comes into force at the beginning of the day.

This replaces the temporary provision made by the Scotland Act 1998 (Transitory and Transitional Provisions) (Publication and Interpretation etc. of Acts of the Scottish Parliament) Order 1999.

== See also ==
- Act of Congress
- Backdating and forward dating, signing a document with a false timestamp (sometimes legitimately) representing a point in time either forwards or backwards
- List of enacting clauses
- Promulgation
- Rule of law
- Vacatio legis
