= Post-dated cheque =

Cheque with a future date

In banking, a post-dated cheque is a cheque written by the drawer (payer) for a date in the future.

Whether a post-dated cheque may be cashed or deposited before the date written on it depends on the country. A Canadian bank, for example, is not supposed to process a post-dated cheque and if it does so by mistake, the cheque writer may ask their bank to correct the error. In the United States and the UK, post-dated cheques are negotiable instruments and can be drawn upon at any time, while in India and Australia post-dated cheques are not payable until the date written on the cheque.

== Practices in various countries ==
=== Australia ===
Under Australian law a post-dated cheque is valid under the Cheques and Payment Orders Act 1986.

16. (1) Where a cheque, or any indorsement of a cheque, is dated, the date shall, unless the contrary is proved, be presumed to be the day on which the cheque was drawn or the indorsement made, as the case may be.

(2) A cheque is not invalid by reason only that- (a) it is not dated; (b) it is antedated or post-dated; or (c) the date it bears is a Sunday.

(3) For the purpose of determining whether a post-dated instrument is a cheque, the fact that the instrument is post-dated shall be disregarded.

(4) A cheque is not incomplete or irregular on its face by reason only that it is post-dated (whether or not the date has arrived).

As well, under Section 61 of the Act, part 2 reads;

Where a demand for payment of a cheque is made before the date of the cheque arrives, the cheque shall not, by reason of the demand, be taken to have been duly presented for payment.

The Commonwealth Bank's rules and conditions for cheques (2014: Section 1.7.6 'Dishonour of cheques') clearly state that a cheque will be dishonoured if it is presented before the post-date as written on the cheque for the reason that, '...the cheque bears a date that is in the future. This is known as a post-dated cheque and it cannot be paid until that date arrives.'

While this is a sound interpretation of Australian law, for insurance reasons the bank protects itself from possible attack with the condition (2014: Section 1.7.1 'Using your cheques '): 'You authorise us to pay a post-dated cheque (one which is dated with a date in the future) drawn on your account and presented for payment at any time before the date of the cheque arrives.'

The Australian Taxation Office require that cheques made for tax payments 'must not be post-dated'. The Australian Federal Police in their information to small businesses on avoiding fraud advise: 'Do not accept post-dated or pre-dated cheques'.

=== Brazil ===
In Brazil, the drawer may seek damages in Justice if their cheque is cashed in before its due date, according to the jurisprudential orientation of the Superior Court of Justice, as per Summary No. 370 of such court.

=== Canada ===
Under the clearing rules of the Canadian Payments Association, a post-dated cheque cannot be cashed prior to the date written on it. If a Canadian financial institution inadvertently accepts and processes a cheque before the due date, the cheque writer may ask their financial institution to return the amount until the day before the cheque should have been cashed.

=== India ===
Post-dated cheques in Indian law are considered under the Negotiable Instruments Act, 1881. Post-dated cheques are common and enforceable. In 1998, the Supreme Court ruled that a post-dated cheque is a bill of exchange and does not become payable on demand until the date written on the cheque

A "post- dated cheque" is only a bill of exchange when it is written or drawn, it becomes a "cheque" when it is payable on demand. The post-dated cheque is not payable till the date which is shown on the face of the said document. It will only become cheque on the date shown on it and prior to that it remains a bill of exchange under Section 5 of the Act. As a bill of exchange a post-dated cheque remains negotiable but it will not become a "cheque" till the date when it becomes "payable on demand".

In India the issue is complex and mainly revolves around section 138 of the Negotiable Instruments Act, 1881. The two major issues before the courts are:

1) Post-dated cheques that are stopped by the bank or issuer, causing problems for whoever is to be paid by the cheque for goods or services provided and;

2) the reverse, in which a person is promised goods or services but does not receive them and has to stop the cheque.

=== Serbia ===
In Serbia post-dating cheques is a customary practice in the retail industry. The retailers will usually accept post-dated monthly cheque payment installments up to several months in advance allowing their customers to pay for expensive goods as a sort of a line of no interest credit.

=== UK ===
In the UK the legislation is clear; 'A cheque is a bill of exchange drawn on a banker payable on demand'. Under the Bills of Exchange and Banking Act 1882, part 10, bills of exchange are payable on demand and in part 13, 'A bill is not invalid by reason only that it is ante-dated or post-dated.' In the United Kingdom, post-dating a cheque carries no legal weight and so such a cheque can be cashed before the due date. However, a bank may refuse to honour a cheque if the post-date is noticed; otherwise, the payer has no right to take any form of legal action against the bank for letting the cheque be processed.

It is common for the terms and conditions of current accounts to state that post-dated cheques should not be written and will be dishonoured if detected. In some instances a post-dated cheque may be retained by the bank and paid on the due date if that date is only a few days away. Some UK organisations do not accept post-dated cheques as well as some Government Departments, while paying income tax or voluntary National Insurance may only be done with post-dated cheques with permission from HM Revenue and Customs.

=== United States ===
In the United States, national banks are permitted to pay checks even though payment occurs prior to the date of the check. According to the Comptroller of the Currency: "A check is a negotiable instrument—the payee, the person to whom the check is written, may negotiate it through the banking system at any time" and check writers seeking redress must restrict themselves to pursuing the payee.

Nonetheless, if "the customer has given notice to the bank of the postdating describing the check with reasonable certainty" the Uniform Commercial Code requires that the notice to be honored. In practice, whether the check writer has any redress against the financial institution where the payee deposited the check may depend on whether it can be shown that the check was accepted over the counter without examination.

== See also ==
- Antedated check
- Stale-dated check
