= Iyuno =

American film dubbing and subtitling company

Iyuno, Inc.
- Type: Subsidiary
- Industry: Dubbing and subtitling
- Predecessor: BTI Studios (1995–2019)
- Founded: 1974; 52 years ago
- Founder: David Lee
- Headquarters: Burbank, California, U.S.
- Area served: Worldwide
- Key people: David Lee (CEO); Daniel Brown (CFO)
- Products: Subtitling, translation and dubbing services
- Subsidiaries: Broadstream
- Website: iyuno.com

Iyuno, Inc. is a major provider of subtitling, translation, and language dubbing services to the entertainment industry. The headquarters are located in Burbank, California with other offices and facilities located in 35 countries around the world.

== History ==
In 1990, the Swedish media company Modern Times Group acquired the majority shareholding in Svensk Text (SDI Media). The then 'SDI Media' was sold by MTG to Warburg Pincus for US$60 million in 2004. In 2007 it was acquired by Elevation Partners, a private equity firm, mainly investing in media and entertainment companies. In 2008, SDI Media Group acquired Visiontext, a competitor in the subtitling industry, from Ascent Media.

On February 21, 2015, Japanese media parent company Imagica Robot Holdings partnered with Sumitomo Corporation and the Cool Japan Fund to acquire SDI Media.

On January 22, 2021, the localization media company Iyuno Media Group announced they had reached a deal with Imagica Group to acquire 100% of SDI Media.

On April 1, 2021, SDI Media was acquired by Iyuno Media Group, forming the new company, Iyuno-SDI Group. On October 26, 2022, the company was renamed to "Iyuno."

In August 2024, Iyuno experienced a significant security breach by an unidentified individual or organization. The breach resulted in the unauthorized release of several Netflix-related films and series scheduled for release in 2024 and 2025. They were subsequently leaked on various social media platforms, raising concerns over digital security and content protection within the media industry.

== Branches ==
SDI Media Norway AS is one of SDI Media Group's Nordic branches. It is located in Oslo, the capital of Norway. The company is commissioned to dub material for film distributors and TV channels. The company used to be known as Sun Studio Norge.

== Production list ==
The following list only contains titles dubbed in English by Iyuno.

=== Television series ===
- Ajin: Demi-Human (Polygon Pictures/Netflix)
- Battle Game in 5 Seconds (Crunchyroll)
- Beastars (Orange/Netflix)
- Beyblade Burst (seasons 1-2 only; OLM)
- BNA: Brand New Animal (Studio Trigger/Netflix)
- Children of the Whales (J.C.Staff/Netflix)
- Dorohedoro (MAPPA/Netflix)
- Drifting Dragons (Polygon Pictures/Netflix)
- Forest of Piano (Gaina/Netflix)
- Godzilla Singular Point (Orange/Bones/Netflix)
- Hi Score Girl (J.C.Staff/Netflix)
- Hubert & Takako (Xilam/Gulli/Canal+/Canal J)
- ID-0 (Sanzigen/Netflix)
- Inazuma Eleven: Ares (OLM)
- Kengan Ashura (Larx Entertainment/Netflix)
- Knights of Sidonia (seasons 1-2 only; Polygon Pictures/Netflix)
- Kuromukuro (P.A. Works/Netflix)
- Medalist (ENGI/Disney)
- Pokémon Journeys saga (OLM)
- Pokémon Origins (Production I.G/Xebec/OLM)
- Record of Ragnarok (Graphinica/Netflix)
- Revisions (Shirogumi/Netflix)
- Tokyo Override (Yamaha/Honda/Netflix)
- Ultramarine Magmell (Pierrot+/Netflix)
- Violet Evergarden (Kyoto Animation/Netflix)
- Yo-kai Watch (season 2 only; OLM)

=== ONA ===
- Devilman Crybaby (Science Saru/Netflix)
- High-Rise Invasion (Zero-G/Netflix)
- Lost Song (Liden Films/DWANGO/Netflix)
- Yakitori: Soldiers of Misfortune (Arect/Netflix)

=== Films ===
- Blame! (Polygon Pictures/Netflix)
- Child of Kamiari Month (Liden Films/Netflix)
- Gantz: O (Digital Frontier)
- In This Corner of the World (MAPPA)
- Kabaneri of the Iron Fortress: The Battle of Unato (Wit Studio)
- My Oni Girl (Studio Colorido/Netflix)
- Penguin Highway (Studio Colorido)
- Pokémon the Movie: Secrets of the Jungle (OLM/Netflix)
- The Seven Deadly Sins the Movie: Prisoners of the Sky (A-1 Pictures)
- Tales from Earthsea (Studio Ghibli)
- Violet Evergarden: Eternity and the Auto Memory Doll (Kyoto Animation)
- A Whisker Away (Studio Colorido/Netflix)

== See also ==
- Playism
- vidby
- Deepl
