= Charlie Cheever =

American businessman

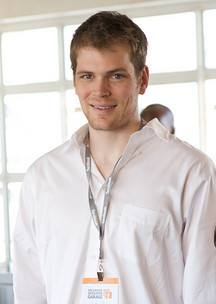
- Charlie Cheever
- Born: August 2, 1981 (age 45); Pittsburgh, Pennsylvania, U.S.
- Education: Harvard University (BA)
- Occupation: president of Expo
- Known for: co-founder of Quora, founder of Expo, BunnyLol, Facebook News Feed, Connect, Gaming, And Castle
- Website: ccheever.com

Charlie Cheever (born August 2, 1981 in Pittsburgh, Pennsylvania) is the co-founder of Quora, an online knowledge market. Cheever also founded Expo (formerly known as Exposition), a framework which creates apps that works on Android, iOS and web by writing the JavaScript code, and a cloud platform called EAS (Expo Application Services) to accompany it. Additionally, he works at castle.xyz, developing the mobile application Castle - Make and Play which allows users to play and create interactive scenes, which can range from simple art and drawings to tiny homemade games and music.

== Overview ==
Cheever is a former engineer and manager at Facebook. Prior to Facebook, Cheever was employed by Amazon.com in Seattle. He left Facebook to start Quora in June 2009 with Adam D'Angelo. He stepped down from active management of Quora in September 2012 but remains an advisor. In 2016, it was announced that he is working as the CEO of Expo (formerly known as Exponent), a startup company that is an open-source platform for making universal native apps for Android, iOS, and the web with JavaScript and React.

== Education ==
Cheever attended Shady Side Academy for high school. He attended Harvard University from 1999 to 2003 where he graduated with a B.A. in Computer Science.

=== Harvard ===
In 2000 Cheever was brought in front of Harvard’s Administrative Board for creating a database of the Harvard student body. The program enabled students to find which dorm their classmates were living in. The database was quickly shut down by the Harvard administration.

Cheever's project is said to have partially inspired fellow Harvard alum Mark Zuckerberg to create the website FaceMash. Zuckerberg later said that he considered Cheever to be a “kindred spirit”.

He is a member of the Fly Club.

== Career ==
=== Facebook ===
Zuckerberg recruited Cheever from Amazon to be an early engineer at Facebook.

Cheever and Adam D’Angelo were responsible for most of the critical programming work involved with turning Facebook from a website into a platform. Most notably Cheever worked on Facebook Connect Authentication, the gaming platform at Facebook, Facebook News Feed, and Facebook Video.

Cheever became known as a top engineer at Facebook after creating one of the most important internal tools, BunnyLol. The Python tool is still used today by every engineer at Facebook.

=== Quora ===
Quora was founded in 2009 and headquartered in Mountain View, CA by Adam D'Angelo and Cheever. However, D'Angelo stayed on as CEO. Quora is a platform for asking and answering questions.

=== Expo ===
Cheever started working on Expo in the summer of 2015. The mission was to open up mobile software development to everyone. Expo makes it easier to develop apps using React Native for major platforms including Android, iOS and Web. Expo is used by large companies like Airbnb, Bluesky, Walmart, SpaceX and Tesla.
