= Elevation Partners =

Former American private equity firm

- Company type: Private
- Industry: Private Equity
- Founded: 2004; 22 years ago
- Founders: Roger McNamee; Marc Bodnick; Fred Anderson; John Riccitiello; Bono
- Headquarters: Menlo Park, California, U.S.
- Products: Private equity funds
- Total assets: US$1.9 billion
- Number of employees: 20+
- Website: elevation.com

Elevation Partners was an American private equity firm that invested in intellectual property, technology and media companies. The firm had $1.9 billion of assets under management. The firm was founded in 2004 and was headquartered in New York City and Menlo Park, California. In the years 2012–2015, their assets were acquired by other companies, with portfolio under the name Elevation Partners closing in 2015. Some members of the board formed a company called "NextEquity Partners", which invests in similar sites. Rock musician Bono went on to co-found "The Rise Fund", dedicated to improving the United Nations' seven sectors of sustainable development.

== History ==
=== Founding ===
Elevation Partners was founded by former Silver Lake Partners professionals Roger McNamee and Marc Bodnick, as well as Fred Anderson (Apple Inc.) and John Riccitiello (Electronic Arts). Elevation is perhaps best known for its association with Bono, lead singer of the musical group U2, who joined the company shortly after its creation in 2004. The firm is named after U2's song "Elevation". As of January 2011 Marc Bodnick departed to concentrate on the development of Quora. Elevation Partners is not affiliated in any way with The Elevation Group.

=== Investments ===
On March 22, 2005, as its first major venture Elevation attempted to purchase Eidos Interactive. However, its bid failed and the video games giant was sold to rival SCi Entertainment. On November 3, 2005, Elevation invested $300 million to create an alliance between video game developers BioWare and Pandemic Studios, placing them under VG Holding Corp. and making it one of the biggest independent developers in the world. It also invested $100 million in Move, Inc., which operates real estate information services.

In August 2006, Elevation announced that it had made an investment in Forbes Media, the parent company of Forbes magazine and Forbes.com. Sources stated that the deal gave Elevation a stake of more than 40 percent at a cost of $250 million to $300 million. After Elevation invested in Forbes, the employee pension plan was frozen. In the years that followed, there were numerous rounds of layoffs worldwide. The Forbes family also sold its iconic building on Manhattan's 5th Avenue to New York University.

On June 4, 2007 Elevation Partners announced an investment of $325 million (€242 million) for a 25 percent stake in Palm, Inc. On December 22, 2008 the deal was followed up with an additional $100 million equity investment in Palm, and is made with newly issued preferred stock of convertible type. On July 11, 2007 Elevation Partners acquired SDI Media Group, the world's largest provider of subtitling and language dubbing service to the entertainment industry. Elevation purchased the company from Warburg Pincus, the private equity firm that acquired SDI Media in 2004. On October 11, 2007, it was announced that EA, now with Elevation founding partner John Riccitiello as CEO, had negotiated a deal with Elevation to pay US$860 million in order to acquire both Bioware and Pandemic Studios. On April 16, 2010, Elevation Partners acquired 1% of the company Facebook for $90 million.

Through September 2014 the fund had generated an 11.4% annual return.

=== Relationship with Wikimedia ===
On March 20, 2008, the Associated Press published a story saying members of Elevation Partners had donated and raised more than a million dollars for the Wikimedia Foundation, and were possibly examining a deeper relationship.

== Portfolio companies ==
- Facebook
- Forbes
- Move, Inc.
- SDI Media
- MarketShare
- Yelp, Inc.
