= Erik Lie =

Norwegian finance professor

Erik Lie is a Norwegian finance professor at the University of Iowa who published a report about options backdating that led to many investigations by the SEC into the potentially illegal practice. He was the subject of profile in Business Week for his contribution to uncovering options backdating scandals.

In 1991 and 1992 he served in the Royal Norwegian Navy and Norwegian Coast Guard.

In 2007, he was listed as one of the Time 100, with the article on his contributions being written by former New York Governor and New York State Attorney General Eliot Spitzer.

== Selected publications ==
- Erik Lie (May 2005). "On the timing of CEO stock option awards". Management Science. 51 (5): 802–812. doi:10.1287/mnsc.1050.0365.
- Erik Lie, with Randall A. Heron (February 2007). "Does backdating explain the stock price pattern around executive stock option grants?". Journal of Financial Economics. 83 (2): 271–295. doi:10.1016/j.jfineco.2005.12.003. S2CID 153491365.
- Erik Lie, with Randall A. Heron and Tod Perry. "On the use (and abuse) of stock option grants". Financial Analysts Journal.
