= Quora =

American question-and-answer website

Quora, Inc.

- Screenshot of homepage
- Company type: Private
- Website type: Question and answer
- Available in: 24 languages
- Founded: June 25, 2009; 17 years ago
- Headquarters: Mountain View, California, United States
- Area served: Worldwide
- Founders: Adam D'Angelo; Charlie Cheever
- Key people: Adam D'Angelo (CEO); Kelly Battles (CFO)
- Revenue: US$20 million (2018)
- Employees: 200–300 (2019)
- Website: quora.com
- Registration: Optional
- Launched: June 21, 2010; 16 years ago
- Current status: Active
- Written in: Python, C++, Ruby

Quora is an American social question-and-answer website and online knowledge market headquartered in Mountain View, California. It was founded on June 25, 2009, and made available to the public on June 21, 2010. Users can post questions, answer questions, and comment on answers that have been submitted by other users.

As of 2020, the website was visited by 300 million users a month. Since its founding by former Facebook employees, the company has grown to a valuation of approximately $2 billion and expanded into the artificial intelligence sector with the 2023 launch of its chatbot platform, Poe.

== History ==
=== Founding and naming ===
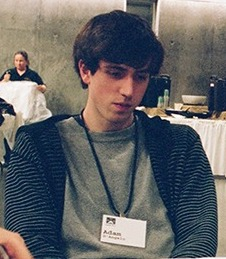
Adam D'Angelo in 2011

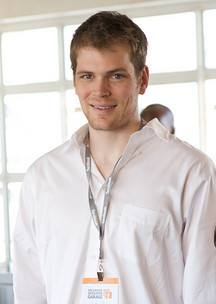
Charlie Cheever in 2009

Quora was co-founded by former Facebook employees Adam D'Angelo and Charlie Cheever in June 2009. In an answer to the question, "How did Adam D'Angelo and Charlie Cheever come up with the name Quora?" Cheever wrote:

We spent a few hours brainstorming and writing down all the ideas that we could think of. After consulting with friends and eliminating ones we didn't love, we narrowed it down to 5 or 6 finalists, and eventually settled on Quora. The closest competition that [the name] Quora had was Quiver.

=== 2010–2013: Early growth ===
In March 2010, Quora, Inc. was valued at $86 million (equivalent to $127 million in 2025). Quora first became available to the public on August 11, 2009, and was praised for its interface and for the quality of the answers written by its users, many of whom were recognized as experts in their fields.

Quora's user base increased quickly, and by late December 2010, the site was seeing spikes of visitors five to ten times its usual load—so much that the website initially had difficulties handling the increased traffic.

In June 2011, Quora redesigned the navigation and usability of its website. Co-founder Adam D'Angelo compared the redesigned Quora to Wikipedia, and stated that the changes to the website were made on the basis of what had worked and what had not when the website had experienced unprecedented growth six months earlier.

In September 2012, co-founder Charlie Cheever stepped down as co-operator of the company, taking an advisory role. D'Angelo then retained a high degree of control over the company.

In January 2013, Quora launched a blogging platform allowing users to post non-answer content. In March of that same year Quora also established a full-text search of questions and answers on its website, and extended the feature to mobile devices in late May 2013. It also announced in May 2013 that usage metrics had tripled relative to the same time in the prior year.

In November 2013, Quora introduced a feature called Stats to allow all Quora users to see summary and detailed statistics of how many people had viewed, upvoted, and shared their questions and answers. TechCrunch reported that, although Quora had no immediate plans for monetization, they believed that search ads would likely be their eventual source of revenue.

=== 2014–2017: Continued growth and new features ===
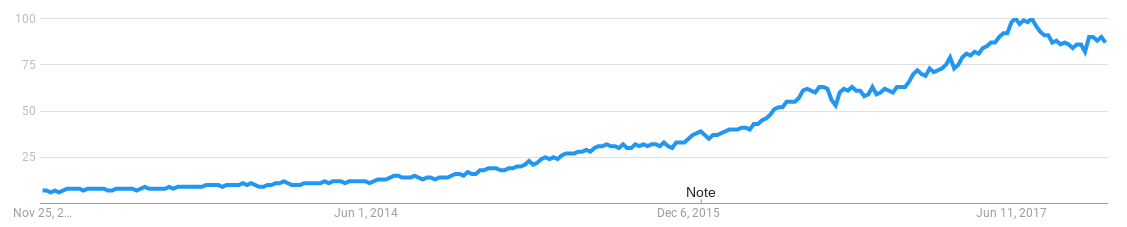
Google Search popularity for Quora, 2012–2017

==== 2014 organization ====
Quora was evolving into "a more organized Yahoo Answers, a classier Reddit, an opinionated Wikipedia", and became popular in tech circles. In April 2014, Quora raised $80 million from Tiger Global at a reported $900 million valuation. Quora was one of the Summer 2014 Y Combinator companies, although it was described as "the oldest Y-Combinator ever".

==== Parlio acquisition ====
In March 2016, Quora acquired the online community website Parlio.

==== Question details ====
Users were able to add descriptions to questions. In early December 2015, these were limited to 800 characters, and questions themselves to 150, not affecting existing questions. In August 2017, question details were discontinued entirely and replaced with an optional source URL input field to provide context, reportedly to encourage users to phrase questions more descriptively. Existing question details were stored in comments under respective questions.

==== Advertisement rollouts ====
Until 2016, Quora did not show ads because

...ads can often be negative for user experience. Nobody likes banner ads, ads from shady companies, or ads that are irrelevant to their needs.

In April 2016, Quora began a limited rollout of advertising on the site. The first ad placement that the company accepted was from Uber. Over the next few years the site began gradually to show more ads, which Vox described in 2019 as "...still relatively sparse."

==== Multilingual expansion ====
In October 2016, Quora launched a Spanish version of its website to the public; in early 2017, a beta version of Quora in French was announced. In May 2017, beta versions in German and Italian were introduced. In September 2017 a beta version in Japanese was launched. In April 2018, Beta versions in Hindi, Portuguese, and Indonesian were launched. in September 2018, Quora announced that additional versions in Bengali, Marathi, Tamil, Telugu, Finnish, Norwegian, Swedish, and Dutch were planned.

==== 2017 anonymity changes ====
On February 9, 2017, Quora announced changes to its anonymity feature, detaching anonymous questions and edits from accounts. When asking or answering anonymously, an anonymous edit link is generated, which is then the only channel to edit the question or answer. Since then, commenting anonymously and toggling one's answer between anonymous and public is no longer possible. These changes went into effect on March 20, 2017. Users were able to request a list of anonymous edit links to their existing anonymous questions and answers until then.

==== 2017 Series D funding ====
In April 2017, Quora claimed to have 190 million monthly unique visitors, up from 100 million a year earlier. That same month, Quora was reported to have received Series D funding with a valuation of $1.8 billion.

=== 2018–2019: Further growth and data breach ===
In September 2018, Quora reported that it was receiving 300 million unique visitors every month.

Despite the number of registered users, Quora did not possess the level of mainstream cultural dominance as sites like Twitter, which, at the time, had roughly 326 million registered users. This could have been because a large number of registered users on the site did not use it regularly and many did not even know they had accounts since they had either created them unknowingly through social media sites linked to Quora or created them years earlier and forgotten them. Quora uses popups and interstitials to force users to login or register before they can see more of the content, similar to a metered paywall.

In December 2018, Quora announced that approximately 100 million user accounts were affected by a data breach. The hacked information included users' names, email addresses, encrypted passwords, data from social networks like Facebook and Twitter if people had chosen to link them to their Quora accounts, questions they had asked, and answers they had written. Adam D'Angelo stated:

The overwhelming majority of the content accessed was already public on Quora, but the compromise of account and other private information is serious.

Compromised information could also allow hackers to log into a Quora user's connected social media accounts, via access tokens. A class action lawsuit, case number 5:18-cv-07597-BLF, was filed in the Northern District of California in 2021, on behalf of named plaintiffs in New Jersey and Colorado.

By May 2019, Quora was valued at $2 billion as a company and it was finalizing a $60 million investment round, which was led by Valor Equity Partners, a private equity firm with ties to Tesla, Inc. and SpaceX. In spite of this, the site still showed very few ads compared to other similar sites and the company was struggling to turn a profit, having made only $20 million in revenue in 2018.

Several investors passed on the opportunity to invest in Quora, citing the company's "poor track record of actually making money". Schleifer characterized the disparity between Quora's valuation and its actual profits as a result of "the high valuation for virtually everything these days in the tech sector".

In December 2019, Quora announced that it would open its first international engineering office in Vancouver, which would deal with machine learning and other engineering functions. That same month, Quora launched its Arabic, Gujarati, Hebrew, Kannada, Malayalam, and Telugu versions.

=== 2020 ===
In January 2020, Quora laid off an undisclosed number of employees at its San Francisco Bay Area and New York offices for financial reasons.

In June 2020, during the COVID-19 pandemic, D'Angelo announced that Quora would permanently allow remote working.

=== 2021 ===
On April 19, Quora eliminated the requirement that users use their real names and allowed them to use pseudonyms.

On August 5, Quora began allowing contributors to monetize their content. In addition, the platform launched a subscription service called Quora+ which requires subscribers to pay a $5 monthly fee or a $50 annual subscription to access content that any creator chooses to put behind a paywall.

On November 22, Quora removed the ability to answer questions anonymously. Instead, they encouraged people who do not want to reveal their identity for legitimate reasons, to create alternative accounts under pseudonyms. The change follows no longer requiring a real name for accounts and was made to reduce the number of policy-violating anonymous answers.

== Operation ==
=== Website ===
URL format

URLs of questions contain only the question title, preceded by /unanswered/ if the question is unanswered. Unlike Stack Exchange URLs, they do not contain a numeric identifier.

User interface

With the help of asynchronous JavaScript and XML, some site functionality resembles instant messaging, such as updating follow counts and an indicator showing that a user is typing an answer.

=== Real name policy ===
Prior to April 19, 2021, Quora required users to register with the complete form of their real names rather than a pseudonym or other screen name; although verification of names was not required, false names could be reported by the community. This was done with the ostensible intent of adding credibility to answers.

Users have the option to write their answers anonymously. Visitors unwilling to log in or use cookies used workarounds to access the site. Users may also log in with their Google or Facebook accounts by using the OpenID protocol.

As of 2011, the Quora community included answers by some well-known people such as Jimmy Wales, Richard A. Muller, Clayton C. Anderson, Barack Obama, Hillary Clinton, and Adrián Lamo, as well as some current and former professional athletic personalities, scientists, and other experts in their fields.

Quora allows users to create user profiles with a name and photo, and access to edit count and other site use statistics. In August 2012, blogger Ivan Kirigin pointed out that acquaintances and followers could see his activity, including which questions he had looked at. In response, Quora stopped showing question views in feeds later that month. By default, Quora exposes its users' profiles to search engines. Users can disable this feature.

The real-name policy was rescinded on April 19, 2021.

=== Answer recommendations ===
Quora has developed its own proprietary algorithm to rank answers, which works similarly to Google's PageRank. Quora uses Amazon Elastic Compute Cloud technology to host the servers that run its website.

As of 2016, Quora has various ways of recommending questions to users:

==== Home feed question recommendations ====
In this method, users have a timeline that is personalized to their preferences. Quora also provides "interesting" questions that are relevant to those preferences.

==== Daily digest ====
In this method, Quora sends a daily email containing a set of questions with one answer that is deemed the best answer, given certain ranking criteria.

==== Related questions ====
In this method, a set of questions that relates to the current question is displayed on the side. This display is not tailored to the specific user.

==== Requested answers ====
This feature lets a user direct a question to other users whom they consider better suited to answer it.

=== Top Writers Program ===
In November 2012, Quora introduced the Top Writers Program as a way to recognize individuals who had made especially valuable content contributions to the site and encourage them to continue. About 150 writers were chosen each year.

Top writers were invited to occasional exclusive events and received gifts such as branded clothing items and books.

The company believed that by cultivating a group of core users who were particularly invested in the site, a positive feedback loop of user engagement would be created.

After not selecting any 2019 or 2020 English-language Top Writers, the program was officially retired in April 2021 but will continue in other languages.

=== Poe ===
Poe is a chatbot feature developed by Quora that serves as a web front end for various large language models (LLMs).

The product was announced in December 2022 and launched to the public on February 3, 2023. Poe was made available to desktop browsers on March 4, 2023.

Poe allows users to interact with a range of LLMs, including OpenAI's GPT series, Anthropic's Claude, Google's Gemini and Gemma, Meta's Llama and CodeLlama, Mistral, Mixtral, and Qwen. It also includes text-to-image models like Stable Diffusion and Playground.

In April 2024, Poe introduced a monetization system for bot creators based on a price-per-message revenue model.

According to the web analytics service Semrush, the website received approximately 8.04 million visits in August 2026.

== Reception ==
=== Reviews ===
Quora was reviewed extensively by the media in 2010. According to Robert Scoble, Quora succeeded in combining attributes of Twitter and Facebook. Later, in 2011, Scoble criticized Quora for being a "horrid service for blogging" and, although a decent question and answer website, not substantially better than alternatives.

Reviewing the website in 2024, Jacob Stern, writing in The Atlantic, was negative, stating that,

A large number of the questions are junk. Many are not really questions at all; they’re provocations. On those occasions when users do seem to be in search of useful answers, the ones they receive are, to put it mildly, uneven. Whatever scant kernels of quality exist on the site are tough to sift from the mountains of inanity—at least in part because Quora tends to place the inane front and center.

Stern said that in order to become profitable Quora had bloated the site with advertising and had encouraged the posting of provocative and clickbait questions, which while likely boosting engagement, drove away the participation of high-quality contributors, leaving the website in what Stern called a "state of thriving failure".

These criticisms were echoed by Nitish Pahwa writing in Slate also in 2024, who suggested that Quora had cut its moderation to reduce its expenses, which, in combination with removing the requirement for contributors to use their real name, had led Quora to become overrun with "trolls" and spam. They also suggested that the Quora partner program had incentivised the mass (often automated) creation of low quality questions and answers.

=== Criticism from users ===
Quora was criticized for removing question details in August 2017. According to some users, the removal of question details limited the ability to submit personal questions and questions requiring code excerpts, multimedia, or complexity of any sort that could not fit into the length limit for a URL. According to an official product update announcement, the removal of question details was made to emphasize "canonical" questions.

The moderation system of Quora, which relies largely on automation, has been frequently criticized as ineffective, inconsistent, and opaque from the users' perspective. The website automatically flags seemingly innocuous actions (such as pasting a web address in order to cite a source) while appearing to ignore answers, posts, and comments that users have reported as false, inflammatory, or harassing. Moderation decisions can be appealed by users, but Quora's handling of appeals is criticized as automated and impersonal, leaving many to wonder how little of the website's moderation is performed by human staff.

The inconsistency of Quora moderation has been blamed for the proliferation of harmful prejudices on the website.

In 2014, in addition to being privately harassed, female users noted a ubiquity of pointed, sexist questions about women with more clearly sexist question details, whereas the same kinds of questions rephrased to be about men were quickly taken down. One user was the subject of a sexually defamatory post containing a photo of her that was taken down by moderation only after the incident was publicized online.

There has also been an increase of antisemitism on the website, as exemplified by a community for Holocaust denial and the presence of countless troll questions containing the numbers 14 and 88 in various contexts, which are almost never removed by the ineffective moderators.

Quora has also been criticised for tolerating propaganda and disinformation campaigns, particularly those from the Chinese government, which has launched massive waves of disinformation and influence campaigns in an attempt to improve their international perception.

== Use in influence operations ==
Despite being blocked in mainland China, in 2018, the People's Daily reported on the value of Quora for coordinated influence campaigns to promote the image of China abroad.

In 2020, Ben Nimmo, a founder of the Atlantic Council's Digital Forensic Research Lab, noted Quora's popularity as a place to create fake accounts and plant disinformation.

In 2023, Meta Platforms stated that China's Ministry of Public Security's Spamouflage influence operation had targeted Quora. The same year, a publication by the Publicity Department of the Chinese Communist Party stated that the CCP should expand its use of Quora.

== Timeline ==
| Date | Event type | Details |
|---|---|---|
| June 2009 | Product | Quora founded |
| June 2010 | Product | Quora announces that it will open up to the public |
| January 2011 | Team | Marc Bodnick leaves Elevation Partners to join Quora |
| February 2011 | Technology | Quora chooses C++ over C for its high-performance services |
| July 2011 | Product | Quora introduces video to its Q&A pages |
| July 2011 | Product | Quora introduces Credits for asking-to-answer questions |
| September 2011 | Product | Quora introduces threaded comments and comment voting |
| September 2012 | Team | Co-founder Charlie Cheever leaves |
| November 2012 | Product | Quora introduces Top Writers program |
| January 2013 | Product | Quora introduces blogs |
| March 2013 | Product | Quora introduces a policy eliminating image-only answers. |
| April 2014 | Funding | Quora raises $80 million in a series C at a $900 million valuation, with Tiger Global Management and Y Combinator as investors |
| January 2016 | Product | Quora announces bounty system, offering financial bounties for the best answer (selected by the question asker) on select questions. |
| March 2016 | Product | Quora acquires Parlio, an online Q&A site started by Wael Ghonim. |
| April 2016 | Product | Quora announces that it will start testing advertisements on a small number of question pages. |
| May 2016 | Team | Marc Bodnick, Quora's business and moderation team leader and spokesman announces that he is leaving the company. |
| August 2016 | Product | Quora announces support for the Spanish language. |
| November 2016 | Team | Wikimedia Foundation trustee Kelly Battles announced as new chief financial officer (CFO). |
| February 2017 | Product | Quora integrates Wikidata into its topic management. |
| April 2017 | Funding | Quora raises $85 million in a series D funding round at a $1.8 billion valuation, with Collaborative Fund and Y Combinator as investors |
| July 2017 | Product | Quora announces support for the German and Italian languages. |
| September 2017 | Product | Quora announces support for the Japanese language. |
| April 2018 | Product | Quora launches Video Answers. |
| April 2018 | Product | Quora introduces the Quora Partner Program. |
| June 2018 | Product | Quora announces support for the Hindi, Indonesian, and Portuguese languages. |
| February 2018 | Product | Quora announces the launch of the Links feature, which shows links to articles on other websites in the users' feed. Initially, the links were automatically sorted to topics and posted by the software to the users' feeds according to the topics they follow, and also appeared in a "Links" tab on topics pages. The Links tab was later removed from topics pages without announcement. |
| May 2018 | Product | Quora announces the launch of Sharing, a kind of reblogging. |
| August 2018 | Product | Quora launches the ability for users to share links. |
| September 2018 | User Base | Quora hits 300 million monthly users |
| November 2018 | Product | Quora launches the "Spaces" feature, and subsequently converts existing blogs on the platform to spaces. |
| December 2018 | Security | Quora reported a data breach that affected 100 million of its users' data. |
| January 2019 | Product | Quora announces support for the Dutch, Danish, Finnish, Norwegian, Swedish, Marathi, Bengali, and Tamil languages. |
| December 2019 | Team | Quora announces that it will open its first international engineering office in Vancouver. |
| December 2019 | Product | Quora announces support for the Arabic, Gujarati, Hebrew, Kannada, Malayalam, and Telugu languages. |
| January 2020 | Team | An undisclosed number of Quora employees are laid off. |
| April 2021 | Product | Quora rescinds its real names policy, allowing users to use pseudonyms. |
| August 2021 | Product | Quora allows contributors to monetize their content and launches a subscription service called Quora+. |
| August 2022 | Product | Quora announced the discontinuation of Quora Partner Program in English for September 2022 and for all other languages in March 2023. |
| February 2023 | Product | Quora launched its AI-powered chatbot called Poe to the public. |
| April 2024 | Product | New on Poe: Creator monetisation via price per message |
| April 2024 | Product | Users could create Multi-bot chats on Poe |
| October 2024 | Product | Discontinuation of Space Subscriptions and Ads Revenue Sharing Programs |

== See also ==
- Comparison of Q&A sites
- Stack Exchange
- Yahoo! Answers
