= Hunted Forever =

2008 video game

- Platform: Flash
- Release: 2008
- Genre: Platform
- Mode: Single-player

Hunted Forever is browser-based platform game released in 2008. It was created by Canadian developer Evan Miller who was a college student at the time. The game was developed in 6 weeks in Adobe Flash. Miller first published the game on the social gaming website King in October 2008, from where it spread to other online gaming websites.

The game was listed in the 8th spot in Time's "Top 10 Video Games of 2008" list, where it was praised for its style and innovation. As of late 2008, the game has been played some 2 million times.
