= Mary Kirby =

Mary Kirby may refer to:

- Mary Kirby (writer) (1817–1893), English writer and illustrator, with her sister Elizabeth
- Mary Jane Kirby (born 1989), Canadian rugby union player
- Mary Kostka Kirby (1863–1952), New Zealand Catholic nun
- Mary Ella Kirby Berry (1916–1957), née Kirby, medical missionary
