= Backdating =

Timestamp older than the date actually signed

Backdating, also called antedating, is when a document is signed with a timestamp that has an earlier (older) date and/or time than when the document is actually signed. The opposite is forward dating, meaning that a later date/time is written than what is actually the time at the time of writing. Backdating and forward dating are in many contexts undesirable and can constitute document forgery, but can also have legitimate purposes.

== Examples ==
Backdating is often considered questionable at best. For example, documents may be backdated as part of a tax fraud scheme if the tax rate for a particular transaction has just increased. By backdating the document, the old tax rate is paid. If a claim is made after an insurance policy has expired, backdating can give the impression that the claim arose while the insurance was still in effect.

In some cases, backdating is irrelevant, for example if the law is concerned with the point in time of receipt, rather than the time of dispatch.

Some other examples of backdating are:

- Antedated contract, takes effect earlier than its signing date
- Antedated cheque, dated earlier than its date of signing
- Options backdating, altering a stock option's date of granting to a time when the stock was less valuable

== See also ==
- Blockchain, distributed database for ledgering digital transactions
- Effective date, point in time at which something comes into force
- Ex post facto law, law with retroactive effect
- Sequence number, consecutive number in a sequence of numbers, for example used in sorting
- Timestamp, information referring to when a particular event happened
