= Antedated cheque =

In banking, antedated refers to cheques which have been written by the drawer, and dated at some point in the past (i.e. backdated). In the United States antedated cheques are described in the Uniform Commercial Code's Article 3, Section 113.

== See also ==
- Post-dated cheque
