= John Riccitiello =

American business executive (born 1957/1958)

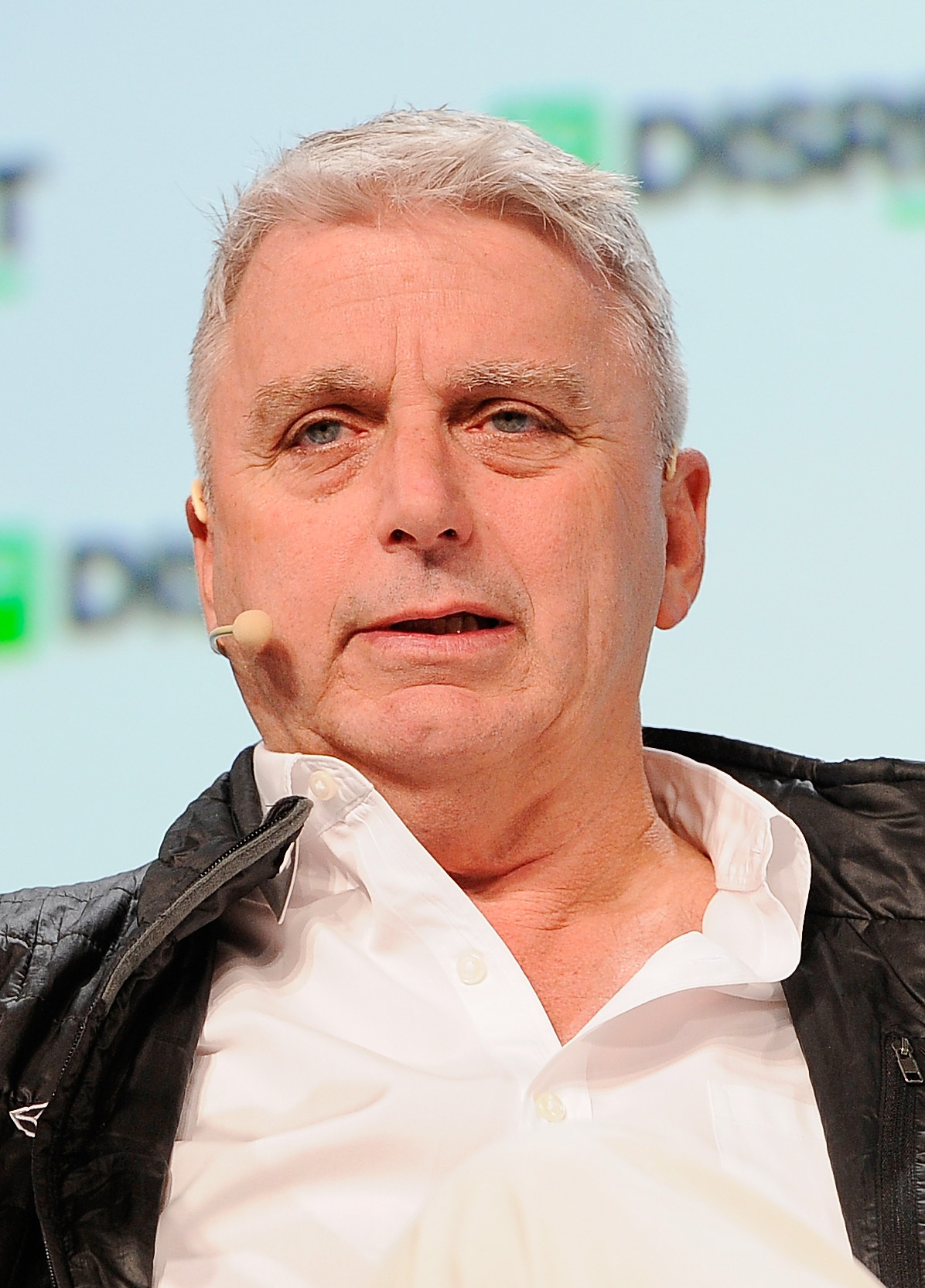
- Riccitiello in 2018
- Born: 1957 or 1958 (age 68–69); Erie, Pennsylvania, U.S.
- Education: University of California, Berkeley
- Occupations: Former Chief executive officer; Co-owner of Gratz Pilates
- Years active: 1993–2023
- Employer(s): Wilson Sporting Goods (1993–1995); Sara Lee Bakery Worldwide (1996–1997); Electronic Arts (1997–2004); Elevation Partners (2004–2007); Electronic Arts (2007–2014); Unity Technologies (2014–2023); Gratz Pilates (2024–)
- Board member of: Entertainment Software Association; Entertainment Software Rating Board; Haas School of Business; USC School of Cinematic Arts; Unity Technologies
- Children: 2

John Riccitiello (/rɪkɪˈtɛloʊ/; born 1957 or 1958) is an American business executive. Previously, he was chief executive officer, chief operating officer and president of Unity Technologies, Electronic Arts, and co-founded private equity firm Elevation Partners in 2004. Riccitiello has sat on several company boards, including those of the Entertainment Software Association, the Entertainment Software Rating Board, the Haas School of Business and the USC School of Cinematic Arts.

== Early life and education ==
John Riccitiello was born in 1957 or 1958 in Erie, Pennsylvania. He earned his Bachelor of Science degree from the University of California, Berkeley's Haas School of Business in 1981.

== Career ==
Early in his career, Riccitiello worked at Clorox and PepsiCo, and was managing director of the Häagen-Dazs division of Grand Metropolitan, during which time he spearheaded an advertising campaign which successfully broke Häagen-Dazs into the European market. He was named president and chief executive officer (CEO) of Wilson Sporting Goods, as well as chairman of MacGregor Golf, in late 1993. He then was president and CEO of Sara Lee Corporation's Sara Lee Bakery Worldwide unit, from March 1996 to September 1997.

Riccitiello joined video game company Electronic Arts (EA) in September 1997, initially as president and chief operating officer until 2004. He left the company to co-found and be a partner of Elevation Partners, a private equity firm specializing in entertainment and media businesses, along with Roger McNamee and Bono. Riccitiello returned to EA as CEO from February 2007 to March 2013, when the board of directors accepted his resignation because of the company's financial performance. Riccitiello's time as CEO was mired with controversy for EA, with EA being voted the worst company in America two years in a row by Consumerist. EA's reputation suffered due to the increased adoption of unpopular business practices like microtransactions and always-online DRM causing problems with a number of releases, such as SimCity, as well as a lawsuit around allegedly monopolistic behaviour for their football and basketball games. Riccitiello was a strong proponent of including these types of mechanics to increase profitability, once suggesting in a 2011 stockholders meeting adding microtransactions to Battlefield that would require paying "a dollar to reload," suggesting that "it's a great model" and a "substantially better future for the industry." In 2025, former CEO of industry rival Activision Bobby Kotick said "[Activision] would have paid for Riccitiello to stay a CEO forever" because they "thought he was the worst CEO in games."

Following EA, Riccitello worked as an advisor to startup companies and became an early investor in Oculus VR.

Riccitiello became the CEO of Unity Technologies in late 2014, having previously consulted for and joined the technology company's board in November 2013. During his tenure, he has overseen two fundraising rounds, raising $181 million in 2016 and $400 million in 2017. He has also worked to get Unity's game engine into Oculus's software development kit. Riccitiello led efforts to develop the use of Unity's software tools beyond gaming, in industries such as automotive design, construction, and filmmaking. In September 2023, Unity announced a royalty per-installation of games developed using the platform which faced wide backlash from the gaming and development communities, as the system would be extremely expensive for free, indie, or demo games. Many developers that used Unity announced that they would switch to other game engines as a result of this change. This announcement came in stark contrast to earlier statements from Riccitiello, who said in a 2015 interview that "there's no royalties, no fucking around" for the release of Unity 5. Within days of the announcement, Unity announced they would soften the royalty program, abandoning it entirely within a year. On October 9, 2023, Unity announced that Riccitiello would be leaving the company amid the controversy, appointing Jim Whitehurst as interim CEO and president. By May 2024, stock prices had declined 60% over the year, and the usage of Unity had declined among developers at several game jams.

In June 2024, Riccitiello became co-owner of Gratz Pilates, a Philadelphia based manufacturer of Pilates equipment, alongside his wife and former Unity Chief People Officer Elizabeth Osterman.

=== Boards ===
Riccitiello chaired the Entertainment Software Association and Entertainment Software Rating Board during the early 2010s. He has been on the Haas School of Business' board, as well as the Board of Councilors for the University of Southern California's USC School of Cinematic Arts.

== Recognition ==
Riccitiello was ranked number 39 on Sports Illustrated's 2013 list of the "50 Most Powerful People in Sports".

== Litigation ==
On 5 June 2019, Anne Evans, formerly vice-president in human resources for Unity Technologies, filed a sexual harassment and wrongful termination lawsuit against the company, stating that Riccitiello sexually harassed her. Unity Technologies responded that Evans' allegations were false and that she had been terminated due to misconduct and lapse in judgment. Riccitiello was engaged to the Chief People Officer of Unity when the lawsuit was filed.

On September 10, 2019, the Superior Court of California issued a court order granting Unity’s motion to compel arbitration and stay all proceedings.

== Personal life ==
Riccitiello has two daughters, a step-son, a step-daughter and has lived in various cities for work, including the U.S. cities of Birmingham, Alabama, Chicago, New York City, and San Francisco, as well as Düsseldorf, London, Nicosia, and Paris. He has been described as "politically active", and donated to Barack Obama's 2008 presidential campaign. Riccitiello delivered a commencement speech at his alma mater in 2011.
