= Forward dating =

Forward dating, also called postdating or post-dating, is the signing of a document with a timestamp with a later (more recent or future) date and time than the time the document was actually signed. The opposite is backdating, i.e. writing an earlier date/time than what is actually the time when the time is written. Backdating and forward dating are in many cases undesirable, and can constitute document forgery, but can also have legitimate purposes.

== Examples ==
Tax authorities often forward date documents such as refunds, because the final payment occurs after mailing but before the date on the letter.

Forward dating can also be done in tax fraud if the tax rate for a particular transaction has just been lowered. By forward dating the document, the person concerned pays the new rate.

In insurance fraud, forward dating can be used to give the impression in a claims report that a claim occurred later, thus giving the impression that the insurance was already in effect when the claim occurred.

Other examples:

- Post-dated cheque

== See also ==
- Blockchain, distributed database for ledgering digital transactions
- Discounts and allowances#Forward dating, when a purchaser doesn't pay for the goods until well after they arrive
- Effective date, point in time at which something comes into force
- Temporal database, database concerned with data in regards to different time instances
- Timestamp, information referring to when a particular event happened
