= Adam D'Angelo =

American businessman (born 1984)

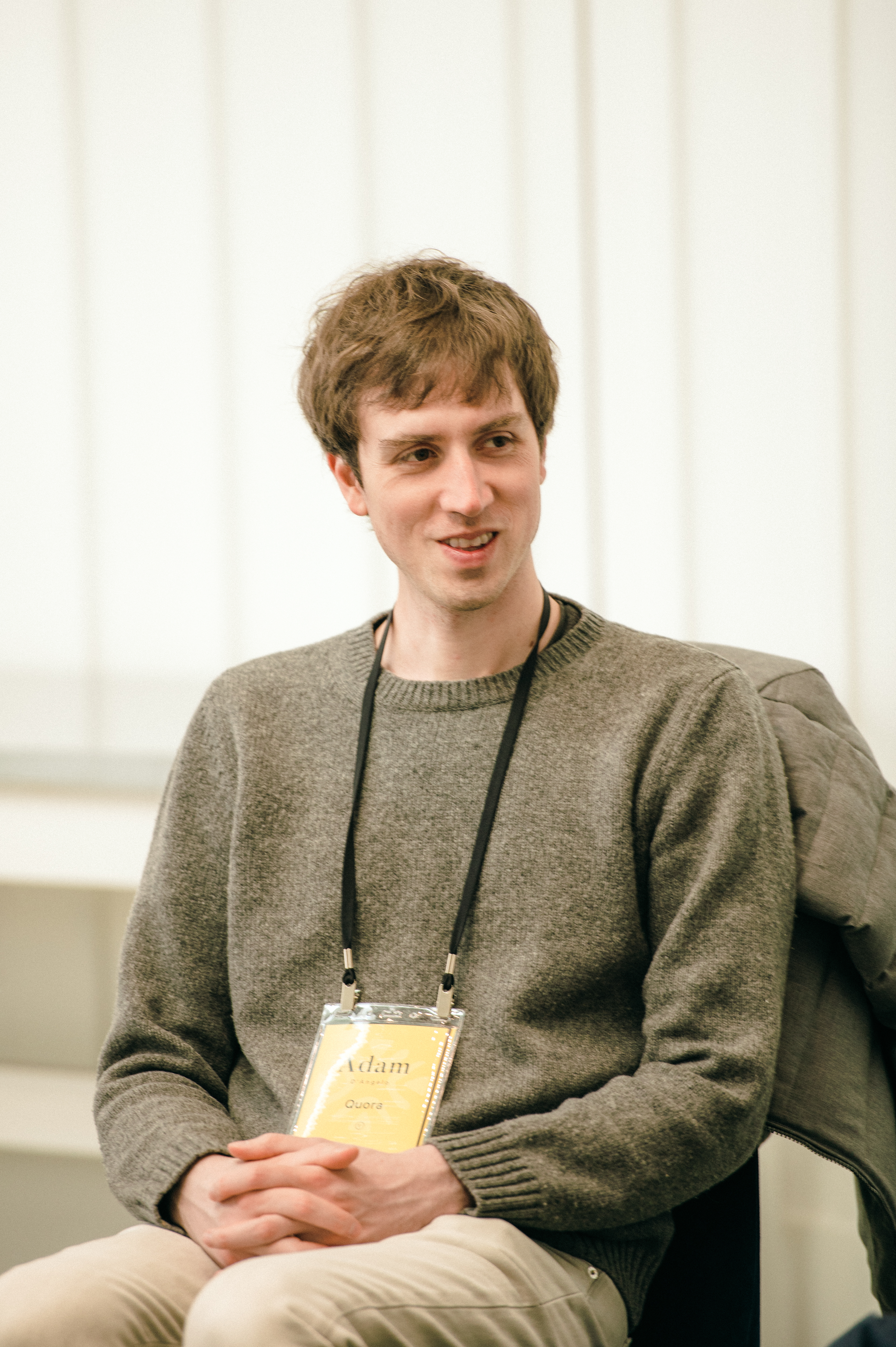
- D'Angelo in 2022
- Born: August 14, 1984 (age 42); Redding, Connecticut, U.S.
- Education: California Institute of Technology (BS)
- Occupation: CEO of Quora
- Known for: Former CTO of Facebook, co-founder of Quora
- Board member of: OpenAI; Asana, Inc.

Adam D'Angelo (born August 14, 1984) is an American internet entrepreneur. He is best known as the co-founder and CEO of Quora, based in Mountain View, California, and as the first chief technology officer of Facebook (now Meta).

== Early life and education ==
Adam D'Angelo was born on August 14, 1984, in Redding, Connecticut, United States. He attended Phillips Exeter Academy for high school. While a student there, he developed the Synapse Media Player (a music suggestion program) with Exeter classmate Mark Zuckerberg and others.

From 2002 to 2006, D'Angelo attended the California Institute of Technology, where he graduated with a B.S. in computer science.

== Career ==
In 2004, while attending college, D'Angelo created the website BuddyZoo, which allowed users to upload their AIM buddy list in order to compare with those of other users. BuddyZoo also generated network graphs based on these lists.

D'Angelo joined Facebook shortly after its launch in 2004, and was its chief technology officer (CTO) from 2006 to 2008, and vice president of engineering until 2008.

In June 2009, D'Angelo co-founded Quora with former Facebook software engineer, Charlie Cheever. In May 2012, he invested $20 million in Quora as part of the company's $50 million Series B round of financing.

D'Angelo was also an early investor in Instagram before its 2012 acquisition by Facebook, Asana, a work management platform, and Lunchclub, a networking platform using artificial intelligence.

In December 2022, Quora launched Poe, a standalone platform that lets users interact with multiple AI chatbots.

D'Angelo was an early advisor to Instagram prior to 2012.

=== OpenAI ===
In 2018, he joined the board of directors of OpenAI. In November 2023, D'Angelo was one of four board members who voted to remove Sam Altman from his role as CEO of OpenAI. When Altman returned to OpenAI, the other three board members involved in Altman's ouster resigned. D'Angelo was the only of the six original board members who remained following Altman's return.

== Honors and achievements ==
- USA Computing Olympiad: eighth place, 2001;
- International Olympiad in Informatics: silver medal, 2002
- ACM International Collegiate Programming Contest (ICPC): California Institute of Technology Beavers (team of 3), World Finalists 2003, 2004; North American Champions 2003; World Finals Silver Medals 2004; World Finals co-coach 2005.
- Topcoder Collegiate Challenge, Algorithm Coding Competition: placed among the top 24 finalists, 2005
- Fortune magazine included D'Angelo as a runner-up in its "Smartest people in tech: Engineers", 2010.
- Forbes List of America's Richest Entrepreneurs Under 40 (2016), number 24: Net worth $600 million.
