= Fred D. Anderson =

American business executive

- Born: Fred D. Anderson c. 1945 (age 80–81)
- Education: Whittier College (BA); University of California, Los Angeles (MBA)
- Occupations: Business executive, venture capitalist
- Known for: Chief Financial Officer of Apple Inc. Co-founder of Elevation Partners
- Board member of: eBay, Yelp, Move, Inc., Sonos

Fred D. Anderson (born c. 1945) is an American business executive known for his time with Apple Inc. and as a managing director and co-founder of Elevation Partners.

== Early life ==
Anderson completed a BA at Whittier College and an MBA at UCLA. According to Walter Isaacson in his book Steve Jobs, Anderson was a former captain in the US Air Force.

== Career ==
Anderson was the CFO of Automatic Data Processing.

Anderson was executive vice president and Chief Financial Officer of Apple Inc. from March 1996 to June 2004. He took over the duties of CEO after the ouster of CEO Gil Amelio and before the appointment of Steve Jobs as interim CEO. His responsibilities at Apple included oversight of the company's controller, treasury, investor relations, tax, information systems, internal audit, facilities and human resources operations. On June 8, 2004, Anderson was appointed to Apple's board of directors. On October 4, 2006, Anderson resigned from Apple's board following a three-month investigation into Apple's stock option practices.

On April 24, 2007, the SEC filed a complaint against Anderson alleging that he failed to take steps to ensure the proper accounting for options granted to him and several other executive officers in 2001. Simultaneous with the filing of the complaint, Anderson settled with the SEC and paid $3.5 million for disgorgement of profits and interest and $150,000 for a civil penalty. At the time of the SEC settlement, Anderson's attorney issued a public statement saying that Anderson had relied on representations from CEO Steve Jobs and unanimous approval of the Apple board in reaching the conclusion that the stock option grant in question was being properly handled. Under the terms of the settlement, Anderson was allowed to continue to act as an officer or director of public companies.

He currently serves as managing director and co-founder of Elevation Partners and NextEquity Partners, a director of eBay, Yelp, Move, Inc., and Sonos. He also serves on the board of trustees of Whittier College and the Stanford Athletic Board. He is a former director of Apple, Palm, E.piphany and 3COM.
