= Technology Transfer Center of Zhejiang University =

The Technology Transfer Center of Zhejiang University (Simplified Chinese: 浙江大学技术转移中心) is currently the largest university technology transfer center in the People's Republic of China. It is the main technology transfer department of the Zhejiang University in Hangzhou, Zhejiang Province.

== Introduction ==
The center was founded as the Technology Trading Center of Zhejiang University (浙江大学技术交易中心) in 1996. In 2006, it was reformed and adopted into the current name.

The center maintains close relationships with more than six thousand domestic companies within P.R.China, and has cooperations with more than two hundred foreign companies.

== Statistics ==
According to authorities, during 2006-2008, it has offered more than 5800 technological transfers and services, and created an economic value of 35 billion Chinese Yuan.

According to the rankings by the Ministry of Education of the People's Republic of China Science & Technology Development Center in 2006, the Zhejiang University Technology Transfer Center was ranked as the first one, before Tianjin University, Huazhong University of Science and Technology and Tsinghua University.

According to a recent similar report (2007), the center was ranked also first, based on its largest annual turnover of 674.23 million. And it was followed by Chongqing University, Shandong University and Tsinghua University.

Currently, there are 76 university technology transfer centers in mainland China.

== See also ==
- Technology readiness level
- Technology transfer
- Technology Transfer Program
- National Technology Transfer and Advancement Act
- Association of European Science and Technology Transfer Professionals
