= The iBridge Network =

The iBridge Network is a Web-based mechanism for the dissemination of innovations such as research results and reports, computer software and other copyrighted works, biological research materials, and patented inventions. It is implemented as a database with Web interfaces and electronic commerce capabilities. As of 2007, providers are predominantly universities and their individual researchers, although federal laboratories and for-profit organizations are also encouraged to contribute. Intended adopters are other researchers and entrepreneurial individuals, groups, and organizations.

The model underlying the iBridge Network is that aggregating research results and inventions from multiple institutions and establishing simple ways to search and transact will increase the flow of innovation to entrepreneurial actors for further development, application and delivery to society.

In operation, researchers and their institutions post descriptions of their results and inventions on the iBridge Network site and set terms of transfer. Prospective adopters search for and review non-confidential summaries of available innovations, agree to terms of transfer, and download an item directly from the site (in the case of electronic media such as software, data, or reports) or arrange for delivery from the provider (in the case of biological research materials or other tangibles). At the option of the provider, innovations may be acquired without special terms or may require acceptance of an electronic license, and may be without charge or fee-based. Any provider charges are payable by e-commerce mechanisms, but the Network itself is a non-profit enterprise.

The iBridge Network goes beyond earlier experiments in expediting technology transfer in several ways:

- greater emphasis on one-to-many transfers (non-exclusive licenses)
- aggregation of innovations from multiple research institutions
- permission and functionality for transactions directly between an innovation provider and the network and directly between the network and an adopter (disintermediation)
- options for fee-based and electronic license-based transactions
- design principles and functionality determined by input from traditional university technology transfer offices.
- management as a not-for-profit

The first realization of the iBridge Network was a 2005-2006 pilot project joining seven U.S. universities by the Kauffman Innovation Network, Inc., an initiative of the Ewing Marion Kauffman Foundation. Flintbox, a software company founded in 2003, and now owned by Wellspring Worldwide, partnered with the Kauffman Foundation in 2006 to provide the technology behind the iBridge Network. Starting in 2007, additional universities in the U.S. and abroad were invited to join, with attention to smaller institutions, for which a confederated approach might increase the visibility and outflow of innovations.

Future growth of the iBridge Network model depends on increasing the number of institutions that list their innovations; the ease with which other researchers, companies, and entrepreneurs can find and acquire innovations through the Network; and the degree to which a network transaction process can partially replace, or in some cases improve on, traditional methods of technology transfer.
