= China Association for Science and Technology =

Chinese government-affiliated organization

- 中国科学技术协会
- Logo of the CAST

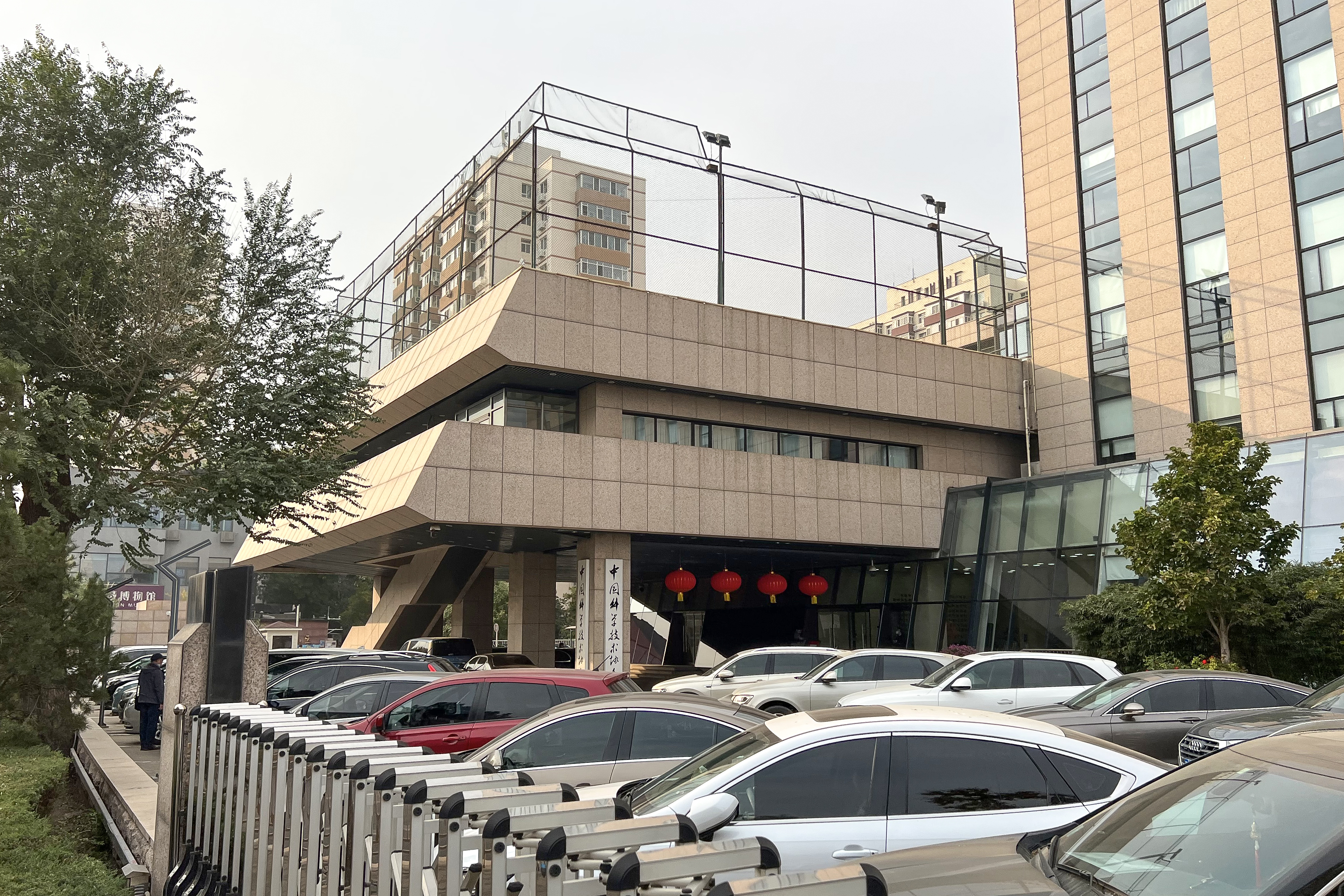
- Abbreviation: CAST
- Formation: September 1958; 68 years ago
- Type: People's organization
- Headquarters: Haidian District, Beijing, China
- Coordinates: 39°54′50″N 116°20′20″E
- Fields: Science and Technology
- Official language: Chinese; English
- President: Wan Guangqian
- CCP Branch Secretary: He Junke
- Vice President: Yang Wei
- Affiliations: Chinese People's Political Consultative Conference
- Website: english.cast.org.cn

China Association for Science and Technology
- Simplified Chinese: 中国科学技术协会
- Traditional Chinese: 中國科學技術協會
Transcriptions
Standard Mandarin
- Hanyu Pinyin: Zhōngguó Kēxué Jìshù Xiéhuì

The China Association for Science and Technology (CAST) is a people's organization of Chinese scientists and engineers, which is composed of multiple national professional societies and hundreds of branches at various local and international levels. CAST was formed in September 1958 through the merger of the All-China Federation of Natural Science Societies and the All-China Association for Science Popularization. Its stated goal is to act as a link between the science and technology community and the Chinese Communist Party (CCP) and government. CAST is a constituent member of the Chinese People's Political Consultative Conference (CPPCC). Wan Gang is the current president of the national committee of CAST. He Junke serves as the Chinese Communist Party Committee Secretary for CAST.

== History ==
In September 1958, the All-China Federation of Natural Science Societies (Chinese: 中华全国自然科学专门学会联合会) and the All-China Association for Science and Technology Popularization (Chinese: 中华全国科学技术普及协会) were merged to establish the China Association for Science and Technology (CAST). The First National Congress of CAST was convened that year.

CAST's work was largely disrupted by the Cultural Revolution.

In March 1980, the Second National Congress of CAST resolved to adopt the name China Association for Science and Technology (Chinese: 中国科学技术协会). Its new head was physicist Zhou Peiyuan.

The China Association for Science and Technology (CAST) is one of the principal non-governmental organizations representing scientific and technological professionals in China. It comprises 189 national-level scientific societies and 32 provincial-level associations, with affiliated organizations collectively representing more than 4.3 million members. CAST and its affiliated organizations participate in more than 240 international non-governmental scientific and technological organizations, and more than 100 Chinese scientists hold positions in the professional bodies of these organizations. CAST describes its role as serving as "a bridge and link between the Chinese Communist Party and the government on the one hand, and scientific and technological workers on the other." Its principal activities include organizing academic exchanges and training, evaluating scientific achievements, conducting professional qualification reviews, recognizing outstanding scientific and technological personnel, and promoting public scientific literacy.

On June 29, 2002, the 28th Session of the Standing Committee of the Ninth National People's Congress adopted the Law of the People's Republic of China on Popularization of Science and Technology (Chinese: 中华人民共和国科学技术普及法). According to Chinese sources, it is the world's only national legislation that explicitly elevates the popularization of scientific knowledge to the level of a national strategy. The law authorizes the science and technology administrative department of the State Council to formulate nationwide science popularization plans, provide policy guidance, conduct supervision and inspections, and implement tax incentives for science popularization activities in accordance with the law. The China Association for Science and Technology serves as the principal organization responsible for implementing these initiatives.

On August 31, 2020, in accordance with the Implementation Opinions on Comprehensively Advancing the Reform to Separate Industry Associations and Chambers of Commerce from Administrative Agencies (Chinese: 关于全面推开行业协会商会与行政机关脱钩改革的实施意见, Fa Gai Ti Gai [2019] No. 1063) issued by the National Development and Reform Commission, seven industry associations formerly supervised by CAST—including the China Industrial Design Association, the Chinese Mental Health Association, the China Fire Protection Association, the China Fashion Color Association, the China Scientific Exploration Association, the China Association for the Promotion of International Economic and Technical Cooperation, and the China Association for Standardization—were separated from CAST. These organizations were thereafter registered directly in accordance with the law, began operating independently, had their administrative functions removed, and no longer required a supervisory government authority. Direct government appropriations were also discontinued, with future support provided through mechanisms such as government procurement of services.

In terms of its political status, CAST is directly led by the Secretariat of the Chinese Communist Party and has a Leading Party Members Group headed by a Secretary of the Leading Party Members Group.

== Technology transfer ==
In December 2003, CAST established the Help Our Motherland through Elite Intellectual Resources from Overseas Program (HOME, also known as "Haizhi") in concert with the Organization Department of the Chinese Communist Party and the Ministry of Human Resources and Social Security. The goal of HOME has been to recruit overseas science and technology talent for technology transfer purposes. Since 2014, CAST has established a series of "offshore entrepreneurial bases" in multiple countries that have been described as a "hub-and-spoke model where a base in China incubates and commercializes innovative ideas sourced from a network of offshore innovation centers in foreign countries."

=== United States ===
In the United States, CAST has maintained relations with the similarly named Chinese Association for Science and Technology (CAST-USA, Chinese: 中国旅美科技协会), a non-profit organization established in 1992 with chapters in multiple U.S. states. The China International Culture Exchange Center, a front organization for the Ministry of State Security, has been a long-time working partner with CAST for its exchange programs. CAST-USA also collaborates with the Ministry of Commerce's "offshore innovation bases."

== Journal ==
Science & Technology Review was begun in 1980 in the United States and is the official journal of CAST.

== Leadership ==
=== Presidents ===
- Li Siguang (1958–1980; elected at the 1st National Congress)
- Zhou Peiyuan (1980–1986)
- Qian Xuesen (1986–1991)
- Zhu Guangya (1991–1996)
- Zhou Guangzhao (1996–2006)
- Han Qide (2006–2016)
- Wan Gang (2016–2026)
- Wang Guangqian (2026–present)

=== Secretaries of the Leading Party Members Group ===
- Zhang Yutai (May 1996 – May 2006)
- Deng Nan (May 2006 – April 2011)
- Chen Xi (April 2011 – April 2013)
- Shen Weichen (April 2013 – April 2014)
- Shang Yong (July 2014 – September 2017)
- Huai Jinpeng (September 2017 – July 2021)
- Zhang Yuzhuo (July 2021 – December 2022)
- He Junke (May 2023 – present)

== See also ==
- Thousand Talents Plan
- Technology Transfer Center of Zhejiang University
- Plan 111
- China Association of Agricultural Science Societies
