= ASTP =

ASTP may refer to:

- A Swiftly Tilting Planet (novel)
- Apollo–Soyuz Test Project, docking in orbit, 1975
- Advanced Space Transportation Program, NASA's core technology program for all space transportation,
- Army Specialized Training Program, a US military training program during World War II
- Association of European Science and Technology Transfer Professionals
- Arak Science and Technology Park
