= Sopheon =

- Type: Public
- Traded as: LSE: SPE
- Industry: Computer software
- Founded: 1 January 1993
- Successor: Wellspring Worldwide
- Headquarters: Minneapolis, Minnesota
- Area served: Worldwide
- Key people: Greg Coticchia, CEO
- Products: Innovation and new product development management software including: Accolade, Acclaim Ideas, Acclaim Products and Acclaim Projects
- Website: www.sopheon.com

Sopheon is a global enterprise software and services company and a wholly owned subsidiary of Wellspring Worldwide, focused on delivering Innovation Management and Strategic Portfolio Management solutions.

== History ==
Sopheon was founded in 1993 by Barry Mence. It has offices in Denver and Minneapolis; the company also has operating units in the United Kingdom, the Netherlands, Germany and Australia.

In December 2021, the company acquired ROI Blueprints, an enterprise planning and execution solutions provider. It is now branded Acclaim Projects.

In May 2022, Sopheon acquired Solverboard, a UK-based cloud business that is now branded Acclaim Ideas for idea management.

In 2024, Sopheon was acquired by Wellspring Worldwide. Sean Downs became the CEO of the combined companies.
