= ASTM International =

Standards organization

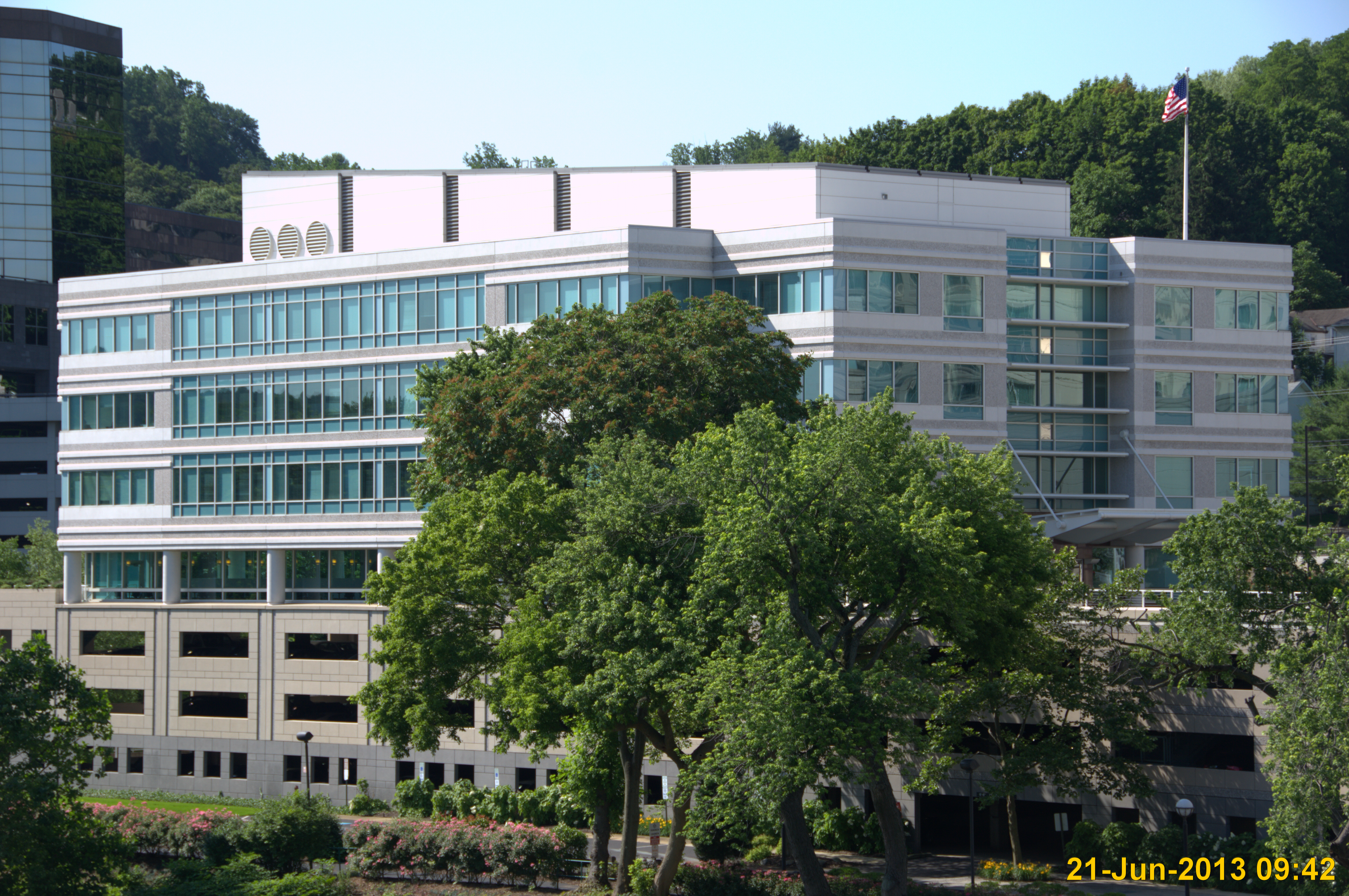
- ASTM's headquarters in West Conshohocken, Pennsylvania
- Founded: 1902; 124 years ago
- Headquarters: West Conshohocken, Pennsylvania, U.S
- Number of locations: Additional offices in Belgium, Canada, China, Peru, and Washington, D.C.
- Area served: United States (1898–present); International (2001–present)
- Members: 30,000
- Website: www.astm.org

ASTM International, formerly known as American Society for Testing and Materials, is a standards organization that develops and publishes voluntary consensus technical international standards for a wide range of materials, products, systems and services. Some 12,575 apply globally. The headquarters is in West Conshohocken, Pennsylvania, about 5 mi (8.0 km) northwest of Philadelphia. It was founded in 1902 as the American Section of the International Association for Testing Materials.

In addition to its traditional standards work, ASTM operates several global initiatives advancing additive manufacturing, advanced manufacturing, and emerging technologies, including the Additive Manufacturing Center of Excellence (AM CoE), the acquisition of Wohlers Associates for market intelligence and advisory services, and the NIST-funded Standardization Center of Excellence (SCOE).

== History ==
Logo as of 2002

In 1898, a group of scientists and engineers, led by chemist, industry leader, and proponent of standardization Charles Dudley, formed the American Society for Testing Material (ASTM) to address the frequent rail breaks affecting the fast-growing railroad industry. The group developed a standard for the steel used to fabricate rails.

In 1961 the name "American Society for Testing and Materials" was adopted.

In 2001, ASTM officially changed its name to "ASTM International" and added the tagline "Standards Worldwide".

In 2014, the tagline changed to "Helping our World Work better." ASTM International had offices in Belgium, Canada, China, Peru, Washington, D.C., and West Conshohocken, PA.

In April 2016, the Safety Equipment Institute (SEI) became a subsidiary of ASTM International. SEI is an accredited third-party certification organization that certifies various types of personal protective equipment to industry consensus standards.

On June 9, 2022, it was announced that the European Committee for Standardization (CEN) and ASTM International agreed to extend and expand a Technical Cooperation Agreement from 2019.

== Membership and organization ==
Membership in the organization is open to anyone interested in its activities. Standards are developed within committees, and new committees are formed as needed, upon request of interested members. Membership in most committees is voluntary and is initiated by the member's request, not by appointment or invitation.

Members are classified as users, producers, consumers, and "general interest". The latter includes academics and consultants. Users include industry users, who may be producers in the context of other technical commodities, and end-users such as consumers. To meet the requirements of antitrust laws, producers must constitute less than 50% of every committee or subcommittee, and votes are limited to one per producer company. Because of these restrictions, there can be a substantial waiting-list of producers seeking organizational memberships on the more popular committees. Members can participate without a formal vote and their input will be fully considered.

As of 2015, ASTM has more than 30,000 members, including over 1,150 organizational members, from more than 140 countries. The members serve on one or more of 140+ ASTM Technical Committees. ASTM International has several awards for contributions to standards authorship, including the ASTM International Award of Merit (the organization's highest award) ASTM International is classified by the United States Internal Revenue Service as a 501(c)(3) nonprofit organization.

== Additive Manufacturing Center of Excellence (AM CoE) ==
In 2018, ASTM International launched the Additive Manufacturing Center of Excellence (AM CoE), a global initiative uniting industry, government, and academia to accelerate research, development, standardization, certification, and industrialization of additive manufacturing (AM). Headquartered in Washington, D.C., with a network of experts across the Americas, Europe, and Asia, the AM CoE focuses on bridging the gap between cutting-edge research and consensus-based standards.

The AM CoE’s main pillars include:

- Targeted research and development (R&D) projects aligned to standards development;
- Certification programs for AM quality management, machine operator competency, and facility safety;
- Education and workforce development through certificate programs, workshops, webinars, and e-learning;
- The Consortium for Materials Data and Standardization (CMDS), advancing high-quality AM materials datasets and best practices;
- Organizing the International Conference on Advanced Manufacturing (ICAM), ASTM’s flagship annual event for AM standardization and qualification.

These initiatives aim to close standardization gaps, support qualification frameworks, and promote the broader adoption of additive manufacturing technologies across the aerospace, defense industry, medical devices, automotive industry, and energy sectors.

== Acquisition of Wohlers Associates ==
In 2021, ASTM International acquired Wohlers Associates, a consulting firm and market intelligence provider in additive manufacturing and 3D printing. Wohlers Associates provides industry analysis and forecasts covering hardware, software, materials, and applications related to additive manufacturing.

Operating within ASTM’s Advanced Manufacturing Division, Wohlers Associates continues to provide:

- Advisory services for industry, government, and investors;
- Market intelligence reports including the Wohlers Report and specialized sector analyses;
- Technical expertise contributing to standards development and qualification frameworks.

== Standardization Center of Excellence (SCOE) ==
Funded by the National Institute of Standards and Technology (NIST), the Standardization Center of Excellence (SCOE) is a more recent initiative under ASTM International. SCOE focuses on advancing innovation and standardization for critical and emerging technologies, offering a coordinated framework connecting R&D, standards development, workforce readiness, and regulatory alignment.

The SCOE works cross-industry collaboration to enable next-generation technologies to be developed, validated, and deployed with globally harmonized standards.

== Standards compliance ==
ASTM International has no role in requiring or enforcing compliance with its standards. The standards may become mandatory when referenced by an external contract, corporation, regulation, law, or government.

In the United States, ASTM standards have been adopted by incorporation or reference in many federal, state, and municipal government regulations. The 1995 National Technology Transfer and Advancement Act requires the Federal government to use privately developed consensus standards whenever possible. The Act reflects what had long been recommended as best practice within the Federal government. Other governments, including state and foreign, have also referenced ASTM standards.

Corporations doing international business may choose to reference an ASTM standard. All toys sold in the United States must meet the safety requirements of ASTM F963, Standard Consumer Safety Specification for Toy Safety, as part of the Consumer Product Safety Improvement Act (CPSIA) of 2008. The law makes the ASTM F963 standard a mandatory requirement for toys while the Consumer Product Safety Commission (CPSC) studies the standard's effectiveness and issues final consumer guidelines for toy safety.

== See also ==
- International Organization for Standardization
- Materials property
- Pt/Co scale
- Technical standard
