= Wellspring Worldwide =

Wellspring
- Industry: Knowledge and technology transfer
- Founded: 2003
- Headquarters: Arvada, Colorado
- Key people: Chris Fanning (CEO), Scott Lindeman (CFO)
- Website: Wellspring.com

Wellspring, founded as Wellspring Worldwide in 2003 by husband and wife team Robert and Sandi Lowe, is a provider of web-based software systems for managing the research and technology commercialization of universities, companies, government agencies, and independent labs.

== History ==
Wellspring was founded in 2003, spinning out of Pittsburgh-based Carnegie Mellon University and initially providing software systems, consulting services and training programs for university technology transfer offices in North America and Europe. Wellspring had European operations in Lisbon, Portugal from 2006 to 2008 and in Cambridge, United Kingdom from 2008 to 2011.

By 2020, Wellspring built its headquarters in Chicago. As of 2024, the company listed its global headquarters in Arvada, Colorado.

In 2007, Wellspring launched a services program in partnership with Carnegie Mellon University to help incubate university-based start-up companies. It was followed by the 2008 release of Sophia Knowledge Management System and Technology Gateway, that allow universities to market research projects and intellectual property available for licensing.

In January 2010, Wellspring acquired Flintbox, a company founded in 2003 at the University of British Columbia to provide a location for universities to post available research projects and intellectual property. Flintbox also provided the technology behind Kauffman's iBridge Network. This acquisition was followed in 2011 by the acquisition of online intellectual property marketing site FolioDirect.

In July 2022, the private equity firm Resurgens Technology Partners announced a major investment in Wellspring. In June 2023, Wellspring underwent a corporate management shakeup, naming new Chief Executive and Chief Financial Officers. Founding member and removed CEO Rob Lowe but he retained a board seat.

In 2023, Wellspring acquired IP Pragmatics, a London-based intellectual property and technology transfer consulting firm. IP Pragmatics, founded in 2001, continues as Wellspring (IP Pragmatics Ltd),

In early 2024, Wellspring acquired Sopheon, whose software solution Accolade is the premier innovation management software in the industry. Together as one company Wellspring now powers the entire innovation lifecycle from conceptualization to commercialization and market impact.

Over its history Wellspring has secured millions of dollars in US government contracts and has a registered lobbying operation. In 2020 Wellspring Worldwide secured an $889,700 Paycheck Protection Program (PPP) loan from the US Small Business Administration. Its stated purpose was to protect 45 jobs on an estimated annual payroll of $4.27 million.

Wellspring provides innovation management and intellectual property software for academic institutions, government agencies, and corporations involved in research and product development. Following its acquisition of Sopheon, the company expanded its offerings to cover various stages of the innovation lifecycle, including research management, intellectual property management, and commercialization processes. The company states that its software is designed to help organizations manage innovation activities and streamline operational workflows.

== Products ==
Wellspring has two main products, Sophia and Flintbox.

=== Sophia ===
Sophia is a software platform that links together projects, inventions, platforms, publications, patents, copyrights and more according to the requirements of the user.

=== Evolve ===
Evolve is the most recent release of Wellspring's tech transfer and IP management software that links together projects, inventions, platforms, publications, patents, copyrights and more according to the requirements of the user.

=== Flintbox ===
Flintbox provides a platform for intellectual property exchange between companies, universities and independent innovators.

=== Astria ===
Asria is Wellspring's IP Renewal software that integrates with Evolve and gives organizations a fully transparent and actionable view of the intellectual property.

=== Scout ===
Scout is Wellspring's technology scouting tool that aggregates data on emerging technologies and startups.

=== Accolade ===
Accolade is Wellspring's enterprise innovation management platform that provides transparency and orchestration for organizations to drive growth innovation. Accolade Core is the operating system that houses an intelligence engine, solutions studio, data security, user access controls, platform scale & stability, API & integrations, and document management. Accolade then has different modules that operate innovation strategy, coordination, and execution designed to drive growth.

== Awards and recognition ==
- 2010 – Named 2nd fastest growing technology company in Western Pennsylvania by the Pittsburgh Business Times. (1st among software companies)
- 2010 – Named One of the Best Places to Work by the Pittsburgh Business Times.
