= Nick Donofrio =

American scientist and engineer (born 1945)

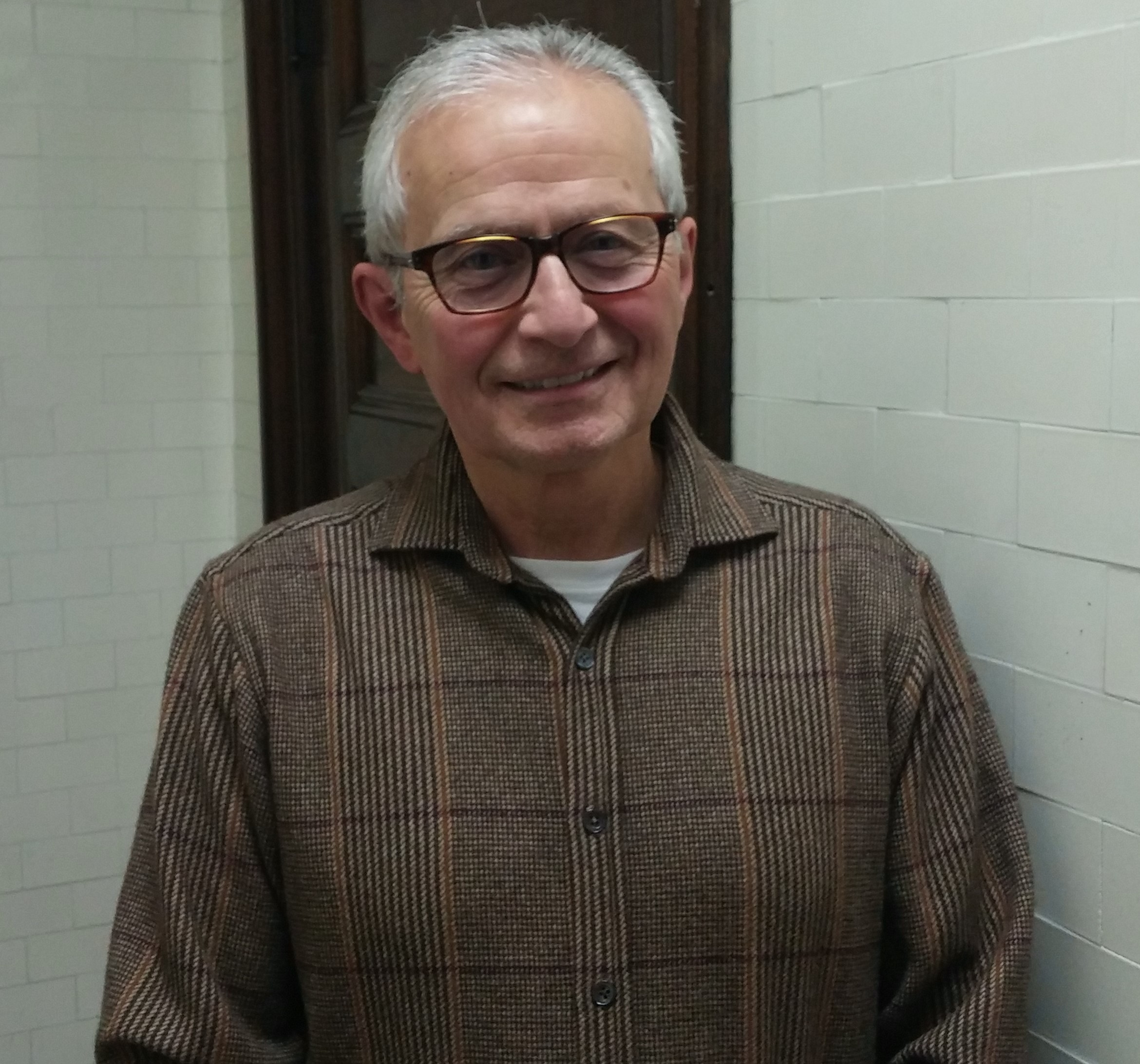
- Nick Donofrio in November 2015
- Born: Nicholas Michael Donofrio; September 7, 1945 (age 80); Beacon, New York, United States
- Education: Syracuse University; Rensselaer Polytechnic Institute
- Known for: Executive Vice President Innovation and Technology, IBM

Nicholas Michael Donofrio (born September 7, 1945) is an American scientist and engineer and was the Executive Vice President of Innovation and Technology at the IBM Corporation until 2008. Upon retirement, he was selected as an honorary IBM Fellow, the company’s highest technical honor. He holds seven technology patents, is a member of numerous technical and science honor societies, and holds several scientific board positions.

In 1995, he was elected a member of the National Academy of Engineering for contributions in the development of semi-conductor memory and technical leadership in computers.

== Biography ==
Donofrio was born in Beacon, New York in 1945. He earned a Bachelor of Science degree in electrical engineering at Rensselaer Polytechnic Institute in 1967 and a Master of Science in the same discipline from Syracuse University in 1971.

He joined IBM in 1967 as an engineer, but moved into management positions which led him to his most recent position.

He serves on the board of the National Commission on the Future of Higher Education and the National Association of Corporate Directors and is a Director at Liberty Mutual Group.

Donofrio has also received honorary doctorates from the Polytechnic University of New York (1999), University of Warwick (2002), Marist College (2005), University of Edinburgh (2006), Pace University (2009), Maynooth University of Ireland (2010), and Syracuse University (2011).

== Books ==
In May 2022, Scribe Media published Donofrio's memoir If Nothing Changes, Nothing Changes. In the book, Donofrio shares lessons learned across almost six decades experience in business and innovation and chronicles the development and launch of seminal technologies such as the IBM S/360, the RS6000, Blue Gene, the Genographic Project and Watson. It includes interviews with more than two dozen business luminaries, including former IBM CEO Sam Palmisano, Apple's Jon Rubinstein, AMD CEO Lisa Su and others. The chapters are framed within lessons learned early in life from Donofrio's blue-collar father and mother.

Donofrio wrote If Nothing Changes, Nothing Changes with Michael DeMarco, founder of American Journeys. It was edited by his longtime IBM communications executive David Yaun.

== Awards and positions held ==
- Chairman at Center for Advancing Innovation (2014–present)
- Chairman at Quantexa (2017–present)
- Industry Week magazine's Technology Leader of the Year (2003)
- University of Arizona's Technical Executive of the Year
- Rodney D. Chipp Memorial Award from the Society of Women Engineers
- The Cooper Union for the Advancement of Science and Art Urban Visionaries Award for Engineering
- Business Week magazine's 25 Top Innovation Champions
- Fellow, Institute for Electrical and Electronics Engineers
- Fellow, U.K-based Royal Academy of Engineering
- Commencement Keynote Speaker, esteemed Advisor, Neumont University
- Contributor, US Department of Education Commission on Higher Education, 2006
- Member of the US National Academy of Engineering
- Member of the American Academy of Arts and Sciences
- Member of the Board of Directors for the Bank of New York Mellon Corporation
- Member of the Board of Directors for Wigix, Inc.
- Member of the Board of Directors for Advanced Micro Devices
- Member of the Board of Trustees at Clarkson University
- Member of the Board of Trustees at Rensselaer Polytechnic Institute
- Co-chair of the New York Hall of Science
- Member of the Board of Directors for The Council for the United States and Italy
- Honorary IBM Fellow
- 2010 recipient of the IRI Medal from the Industrial Research Institute
- Member of the Board of Trustees for the MITRE Corporation
- Member of the Board of Directors for HYPR Corp
- Member of the Board of Directors for Topcoder, Inc.
- Member of the Board of Directors for Sproxil
- Chair of the Connecticut Board of Regents for Higher Education
- International Peace Honors Award (2022)
