= Intellectual property policy =

IP policy concerns for organizations

An intellectual property policy (IP policy) comprises the policies and procedures set up by a company, a state, or an institution that relate to creating, using or disseminating its intellectual property. The purpose of the intellectual property policy is to foster the creation and dissemination of knowledge and to provide certainty in individual and institutional rights associated with ownership and the distribution of benefits that may originate from the formation of intellectual property.

== Different types of IP policies ==
National IP policies express the intent of a country to use the intellectual property system in a defined manner to achieve a stated goal. National IP strategies are measures taken by a government to realize its IP policy objectives. Many IP-related policies and strategies promote research and innovation and encourage the transfer and dissemination of technology.

Institutional IP policies are policies established by universities or research institutions to address IP issues typically encountered during collaboration with external parties and the commercialization of academic research. An institutional IP policy must comply with all relevant national policies and strategies. There will be circumstances where national laws limit how individual universities and research institutions can deal with IP rights or share benefits. Subject to those limitations, each institution may regulate the principles of ownership of IP rights through its internal IP policy, employment contracts and other contractual arrangements.

Companies IP policies are policies put in place by a company to provide general guidance related to the importance of identifying internal IP, managing the disclosure of IP to customers, suppliers, or other third parties, summarizing the goals of IP ownership, outlining typical terms for interacting with strategic partners etc.

== IP policies for universities and research institutions ==
Universities and research institutions seeking to partner with industry or other organizations can adopt a policy for effective intellectual property management and technology transfer. Such policies provide structure, predictability, and an environment where commercialization partners (industrial sponsors, consultants, non-profit organizations, SMEs, governments) and research stakeholders (researchers, technicians, students, visiting researchers, etc.) can access and share knowledge, technology and IP.

The main goals of an institutional IP policy are to provide legal certainty, promote scientific research and technological development, encourage researchers to consider the possible opportunities for exploiting an invention to increase the potential flow of benefits to society, provide an environment that supports innovation and development, balance the various conflicting interests of universities, industry and society, and ensure compliance with applicable national laws and regulations.

An institutional IP policy is a formal document which typically deals with:

- ownership of and right to use the IP
- procedures for identification, evaluation, protection and management of IP;
- procedures for cooperation with third parties;
- guidelines on the sharing of profits from successful commercialization;
- mechanisms to ensure respect for third-party IP rights.

An institutional IP policy is usually part of the broader regulatory framework of an institution. As such, it must be coherent and compliant with the other acts or policies put in place, especially those related closely to the scope of the institutional IP policy, which is the case notably for policies regulating:

- a specific type of IP or asset (e.g. copyright, trademark, utility models, software);
- ownership of copyrighted material created by staff and students including, but not limited to, teaching material, course material, software, dissertations, project reports and theses;
- collaboration with industry;
- use of third-party materials;
- dealing with copyright infringement;
- licensing and assigning rights;
- application of limitations and exceptions;
- user-generated content in e-learning;
- open access policies and strategies;
- copyright in peer-reviewed materials;
- IP issues in websites;
- open educational resources (OER);
- confidentiality;
- functioning of the institution's Technology Transfer Office (if there is one);
- creation of institutional spin-off companies.

No one model policy can be applied across all institutions, countries or companies since there are country-specific differences and different levels of absorptive capacity (i.e. the capacity of local businesses to recognize the value of new external information, assimilate it and apply it to commercial ends).

Furthermore, countries and institutions are still experimenting with different institutional IP policies and practices, gathering evidence on what works and what does not. In some countries, operating an IP management system that meets the National IP policy is required. Making the policy easily and publicly available in the High Education Institution may be a recommendation, such as in Ireland, where a 2018 report showed that 91% of the studied institutions had an IP policy publicly available on their website. WIPO hosts a database of IP policies, manuals, and model agreements from Universities and Research Institutions worldwide.

== Sources ==
This article incorporates text from a free content work. Licensed under CC-BY-4.0. Text taken from IP Policies for Universities and Research Institutions, WIPO.

== See also ==
- Technology transfer
- Diffusion of innovations
- Invention
- Technology licensing office (TLO)
- Technological revolution
- Technology policy
- Science policy
- Intellectual property analytics
