= Han Qide =

Chinese physician and politician

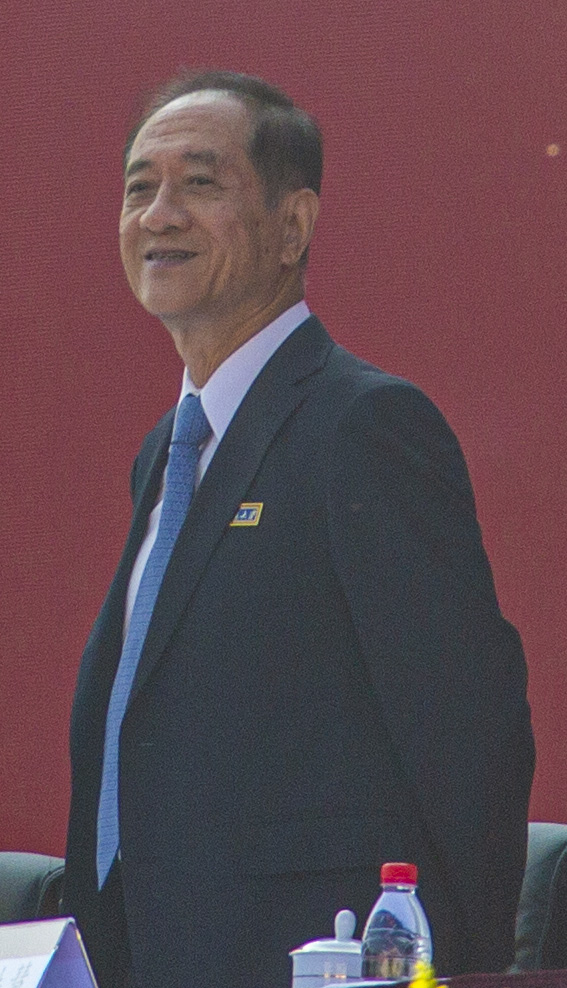

Vice Chairman of the Standing Committee of the National People's Congress
- In office 15 March 2003 – 14 March 2013
- Chairman: Wu Bangguo

Vice Chairman of the Chinese People's Political Consultative Conference
- In office 11 March 2013 – 14 March 2018
- Chairman: Yu Zhengsheng

Chairman of the Jiusan Society
- In office December 2002 – December 2017
- Preceded by: Wu Jieping
- Succeeded by: Wu Weihua

Personal details
- Born: July 1945 (age 80) Cixi, Zhejiang, Republic of China
- Citizenship: People's Republic of China
- Party: Chinese Communist Party; Jiusan Society

Han Qide (simplified Chinese: 韩启德; traditional Chinese: 韓啓德; pinyin: Hán Qǐdé; born July 1945) is a Chinese physician and politician. Han served as the chairman of the Jiusan Society and is a member of the Chinese Communist Party. He was the vice chairman of the Standing Committee of the National People's Congress and served as the vice chairman of the National Committee of the Chinese People's Political Consultative Conference. He also served as the president of the China Association for Science and Technology.

== Biography ==
Han was born in Cixi, Ningbo, Zhejiang Province in July 1945. From 1962 to 1968, Han studied medicine at the First Medical College of Shanghai (later known as Shanghai Medical University; in 2002, it was merged into Fudan University and became its medical college).

Han then worked as a medical staff and clinic physician in many hospitals in Shaanxi Province from 1968 to 1979. Han did his postgraduate study at the Xi'an Medical College (later merged into Xi'an Jiao Tong University and became its medical school). After graduation, Han taught at Beijing Medical College (later merged into Peking University and became its medical college) as a lecturer.

Han served as the last president of Beijing Medical University. When Beijing Medical University was merged into Peking University, Han was transferred into Peking University, and became the head of the Peking University's medical school (PKU Health Science Center), and the executive vice-president of the Peking University. He is currently president of the PKU Health Science Centre and chairperson of the board.

Han was elected as an Academician of the Chinese Academy of Sciences in 1997.

== Political positions ==
- 2000–2002: Vice-chairman of the Central Committee of Jiusan Society
- 2002–2017: Chairman of the Central Committee of Jiusan Society
- 2003–2008: Vice-chairman of the Standing Committee of the 10th National People's Congress
- 2008–2013: Vice-chairman the Standing Committee of the 11th National People's Congress
- 2013–2018: Vice-chairman of the 12th National Committee of the Chinese People's Political Consultative Conference

== Academic positions ==
- 1995–2000: Vice-president of the Beijing Medical University, and the dean of its postgraduate school; Beijing
- 1997–present: Academician of the Chinese Academy of Sciences
- 2000–2002: President of the Beijing Medical University
- 2002–2003: Executive vice-president of Peking University, and the dean of Peking University Health Science Center
- 2002–2003: Vice-chairman of the China Association for Science and Technology
- 2006–2016: Chairman of the China Association for Science and Technology

Party political offices
Preceded by Wu Jieping	Chairman of the Central Committee of the Jiusan Society; 2002–2017	Succeeded by Wu Weihua
Professional and academic associations
Preceded by Zhou Guangzhao	President of the China Association for Science and Technology; 2006–2016	Succeeded by Wan Gang
