= Jiusan Society =

Minor political party in China

- Chairperson: Wu Weihua
- Founded: 4 May 1946; 80 years ago
- Headquarters: Building B, No. 14, Xinxin Community, Wanliu Subdistrict, Haidian District, Beijing
- Newspaper: Democracy and Science; Central Communications of the Jiusan Society
- Membership (2024): 222,000
- Ideology: Socialism with Chinese characteristics
- National People's Congress (14th): 56 / 2,977
- NPC Standing Committee (14th): 5 / 175
- CPPCC National Committee (14th): 45 / 544 (Seats for political parties)

Website
- www.93.gov.cn

Jiusan Society

Chinese name
- Simplified Chinese: 九三学社
- Traditional Chinese: 九三學社
- Literal meaning: September Third Society
Transcriptions
Standard Mandarin
- Hanyu Pinyin: Jǐusān Xuéshè
- Wade–Giles: Chiu-san Hsüeh-shê

Tibetan name
- Tibetan: དགུ་གསུམ་ཤེས་རིག་སློབ་ཚོགས
Transcriptions
- Wylie: dgu gsum shes rig slob tshogs

Zhuang name
- Zhuang: Giujsanh Yozse

Mongolian name
- Mongolian Cyrillic: “ 9 · 3 ” эрдэм шинжилгээний нийгэмлэг
- Mongolian script: ﹃9 · 3 ﹄ ᠡᠷᠳᠡᠮ ᠰᠢᠨᠵᠢᠯᠡᠭᠡᠨ ᠦ ᠨᠡᠶᠢᠭᠡᠮᠯᠢᠭ

Uyghur name
- Uyghur: « 3 - سېنتەبىر » ئىلمىي جەمئىيىتى
Transcriptions
- Latin Yëziqi: “ 9 · 3 ” ilmiy jemiyiti
- Yengi Yeziⱪ: “ 9 · 3 ” ilmiy jemiyiti

Manchu name
- Manchu script: ᠵᡳᡠᠰᠠᠨ ᡧᡠᡝᡧᡳᡝ
- Romanization: Jiusan Xueshe

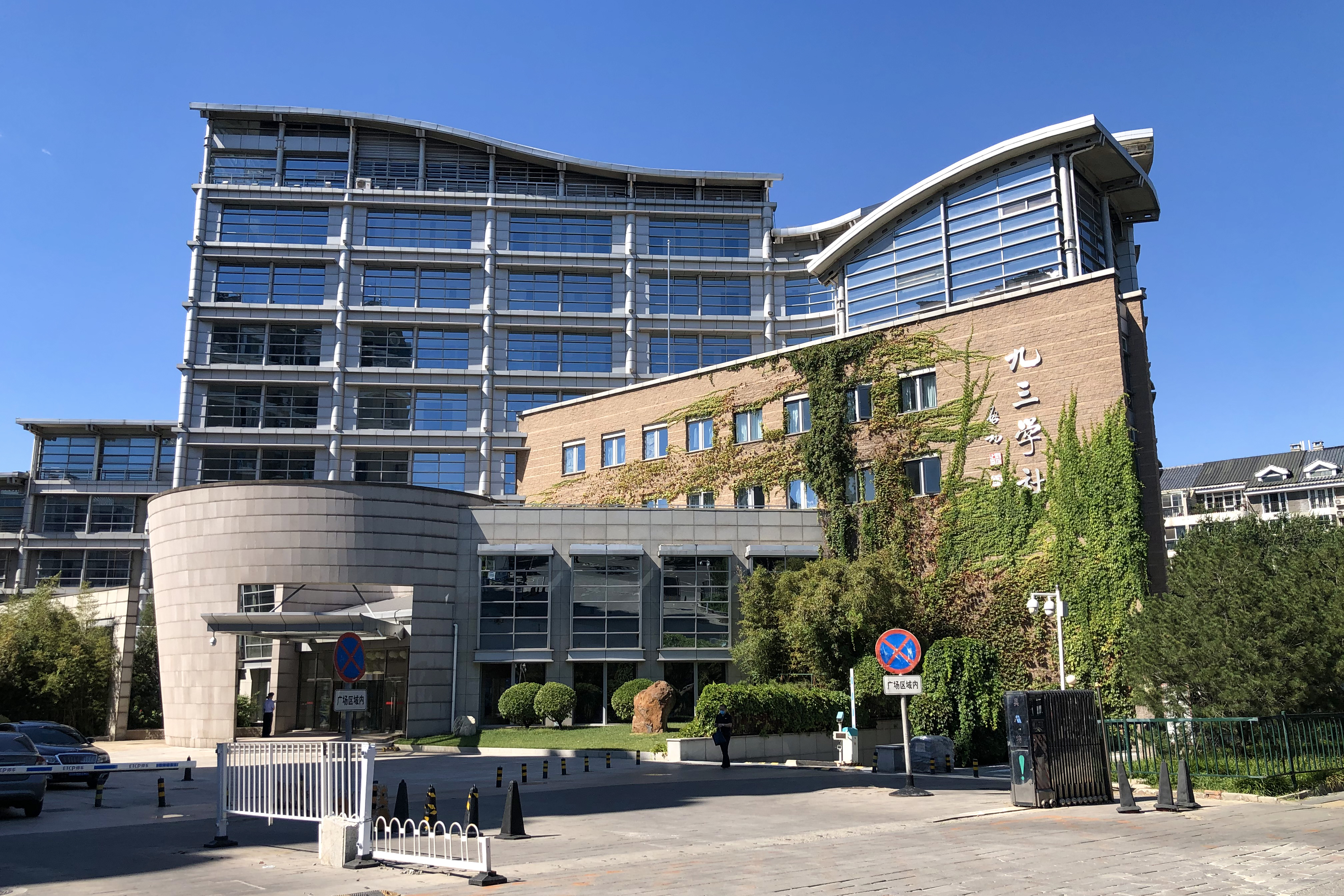
Headquarters of Jiusan Society in Haidian, Beijing

The Jiusan Society is one of the eight minor non-oppositional political parties in the People's Republic of China (PRC), officially termed "democratic parties," led by the Chinese Communist Party.

The party's original name was "Democracy and Science Forum" on its informal founding in 1944; the current name refers to the date of Chinese victory in the Second Sino-Japanese War (3 September 1945). Its membership currently consists of high- and medium-level intellectuals in the fields of science, technology, and education. The Jiusan Society is the seventh-ranking minor party in the PRC. It currently has 56 seats in the National People's Congress (NPC), 5 seats in the NPC Standing Committee and 45 seats in the Chinese People's Political Consultative Conference. Its current chairman is Wu Weihua.

== History ==
The party was originally founded informally in 1944 in Chongqing as the "Democracy and Science Forum". On 3 September 1945, after the end of the Second Sino-Japanese War, the organization was held an enlarged meeting to rename itself to the Jiusan Forum, referencing the date of victory. On 4 May 1946, it was renamed to the Jiusan Society. Its founding members were, before the founding, members of the Chinese Communist Party.

== Organization ==
The party's mission statement is to "lead the nation to power and the people to prosperity". According to its constitution, the Jiusan Society is officially committed to "socialism with Chinese characteristics" and upholding the leadership of the CCP. The party's main focus is scientific and educational development. It is the seventh-ranking minor democratic party in China. The party is a member of the Chinese People's Political Consultative Conference.

The highest body of the Jiusan Society officially is the National Congress, which is held every five years. The 12th National Congress, held in December 2022, was the most recently held Party Congress. As of 30 October 2024, the Jiusan Society has 30 province-level, 282 prefecture-level city, 29 county-level and 8,116 grassroot level organizations. The party publishes the newspapers Democracy and Science (民主与科学) and Central Communications of the Jiusan Society (九三中央社讯).

=== Composition ===
The party's membership mostly consists of high- and medium-level intellectuals in the fields of science, technology, and education. As of October 2024, the party has 222,000 members, of whom 126,000 are senior academicians.

=== Chairpersons ===
No.	Chairperson	Took office	Left office	Ref.
1	Xu Deheng 许德珩	4 May 1946	January 1988	
2	Zhou Peiyuan 周培源	January 1988	December 1992	
3	Wu Jieping 吴阶平	December 1992	December 2002	
4	Han Qide 韩启德	December 2002	December 2017	
5	Wu Weihua 武维华	7 December 2017	Incumbent	

== National People's Congress elections ==
Election year	Number of seats
2017–18	64 / 2,970
2022–23	56 / 2,977
