= Wickham Skinner =

American business theorist (1924–2019)

- Born: February 20, 1924; Cincinnati
- Died: January 28, 2019 (aged 94); Saint George, Maine
- Education: Yale University; Harvard Business School
- Occupation: Academic

C. Wickham Skinner (February 20, 1924 – January 28, 2019) was an American business theorist. He was the Emeritus James E. Robison Professor of Business Administration at the Harvard Business School and has been called "the father of manufacturing strategy".

== Early life ==
Wickham Skinner graduated from Yale University, with a bachelor's degree in chemical engineering. After serving with the Engineering Corps for duty on the Manhattan Project, Skinner earned a masters degree in business administration from Harvard Business School in 1948.

== Career ==
Skinner worked for Honeywell for a decade.

Skinner became a professor at his alma mater, the Harvard Business School. He served as its Director of International Activities from 1967 to 1970. In 1974, he was appointed to the James E. Robinson chair in Business Administration. He was Associate Dean from 1974 to 1977. One of the students he mentored was William J. Abernathy.

Skinner was a director and the vice president of the Ocean Energy Institute. He was the recipient of an honorary doctorate from the University of Ghent in 2002. He was a Fellow of Academy of Management.

== Selected writings ==
=== Books ===
- Impact of New Technology: People and Organizations in Manufacturing and Allied Industries (with Arup K. Chakraborty, Elsevier Science, 1982).
- Manufacturing: The Formidable Competitive Weapon (New York City: John Wiley & Sons, 1985).

=== Articles ===
- Manufacturing—Missing Link in Corporate Strategy (Harvard Business Review, May 1969): in this article he addresses a concern that companies' senior executives are out of touch with manufacturing as an activity and value earner, while industrial and computing engineers lack knowledge of corporate strategy.
- The Productivity Paradox (Harvard Business Review, July 1986).
