= Wu Jieping =

Chinese medical scientist and politician (1917–2011)

- 吴阶平
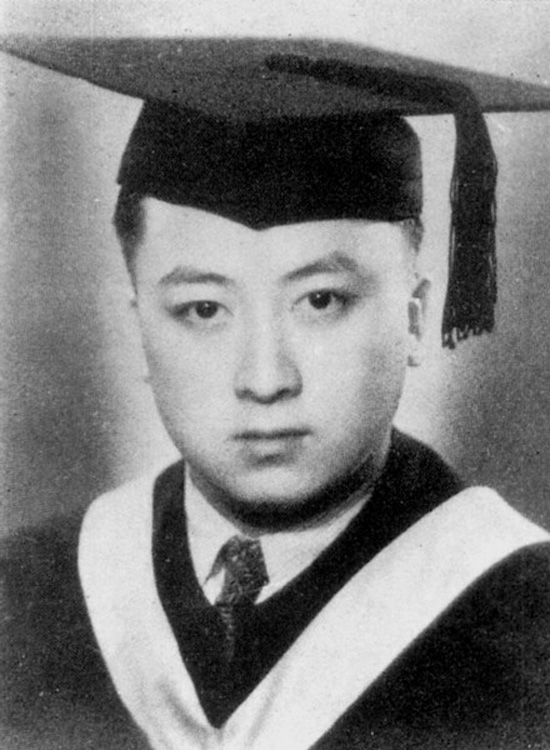
- Graduation photo of Wu Jieping in 1937 in Yenching University.

Vice Chairman of the Standing Committee of the National People's Congress
- In office 27 March 1993 – 15 March 2003
- Chairman: Li Peng

Chairman of the Jiusan Society
- In office 1992–2002
- Preceded by: Zhou Peiyuan
- Succeeded by: Han Qide

Vice Chairman of the Jiusan Society
- In office 1989–1992
- Leader: Zhou Peiyuan (chairman)

Personal details
- Born: Wu Tairan (吴泰然); January 22, 1917 Wujin County, Jiangsu, China
- Died: March 2, 2011 (aged 94) Beijing, China
- Party: Chinese Communist Party; Jiusan Society
- Spouse(s): Zhao Junkai (m. 1933; died 1978) Gao Rui
- Parent: Wu Jingyi
- Education: Yenching University; Peking Union Medical College; University of Chicago
- Occupation: Politician, medical scientist

Wu Jieping (simplified Chinese: 吴阶平; traditional Chinese: 吳階平; pinyin: Wú Jiēpíng; 22 January 1917 – 2 March 2011) was a Chinese medical scientist and politician. Wu was the Chairman of Central Committee of Jiusan Society from 1992 to 2002, and a vice chairman of the National People's Congress Standing Committee between 1993 and 2003. Wu was a member of the Chinese Academy of Sciences and a fellow of the World Academy of Sciences.

== Biography ==
Wu was born Wu Tairan in Wujin County, Jiangsu, on January 22, 1917, the second of four sons of Wu Jingyi (Chinese: 吴敬仪), a Chinese businessman. His elder brother Wu Ruiping (Chinese: 吴瑞萍) and younger brothers Wu Weiran (Chinese: 吴蔚然) and Wu Anran (Chinese: 吴安然) are also medical scientists. Wu was raised in Tianjin. He earned a Bachelor of Science degree from Yenching University in 1937 and a Doctor of Medicine degree from Peking Union Medical College in 1942. He studied urology under Xie Yuanfu (Chinese: 谢元甫). He was accepted to University of Chicago in 1947.

After the founding of the People's Republic of China, he worked at Peking University Health Science Center. In 1951, he and his medical teams participated in the Korean War. Wu joined the Chinese Communist Party in 1956. In 1980, he was elected a fellow of the Chinese Academy of Sciences. He served as vice-chairman of Central Committee of Jiusan Society in 1989, and three years later promoted to the chairman position. In 1993 he was promoted to become the vice chairman of the Standing Committee of the National People's Congress, a position he held until 2003. On February 28, 2000, the Wu Jieping Medical Foundation was founded in Beijing.

Wu died in Beijing on March 2, 2011.

== Personal life ==
Wu was twice married. He married his first wife Zhao Junkai (Chinese: 赵君恺) at the age of 16 when he was a student in Yenching University, she died in 1978. A few years later, he married Gao Rui (Chinese: 高睿).

Party political offices
Preceded by Zhou Peiyuan	Chairman of Central Committee of Jiusan Society; 1992–2002	Succeeded by Han Qide
