= Edmondo =

- Gender: Masculine
- Language: Italian

Origin
- Language: Latin
- Meaning: Wealthy guardian

Edmondo is an Italian masculine given name. Its meaning is "wealthy guardian". Persons with the name include:

- Edmondo Amati (1920–2002), Italian film producer
- Edmondo De Amicis (1846–1908), Italian writer and journalist
- Edmondo Bacci (1913–1978), Italian painter
- Edmondo Ballotta (born 1930), Italian pole vaulter
- Edmondo Cirielli (born 1964), Italian politician
- Edmondo Fabbri (1921–1995), Italian football player and coach
- Edmondo Lorenzini (1937–2020), Italian football player
- Edmondo Lupieri (born 1950), Italian scholar
- Edmondo Mingione (born 1952), Italian former swimmer
- Edmondo Mornese (1910–1962), Italian football player
- Edmondo Rabanser (1936–2016), Italian ice hockey player
- Edmondo Rossoni (1884–1965), Italian politician
- Edmondo Sanjust di Teulada (1858–1936), Italian engineer and politician
- Edmondo Tieghi (born 1930), Italian actor
- Edmondo Della Valle (1904–1976), Italian football player
- Edmondo Zacchini (1894–1981), Italian circus entertainer
