= Wu Weihua =

Chinese biologist and politician

- 武维华
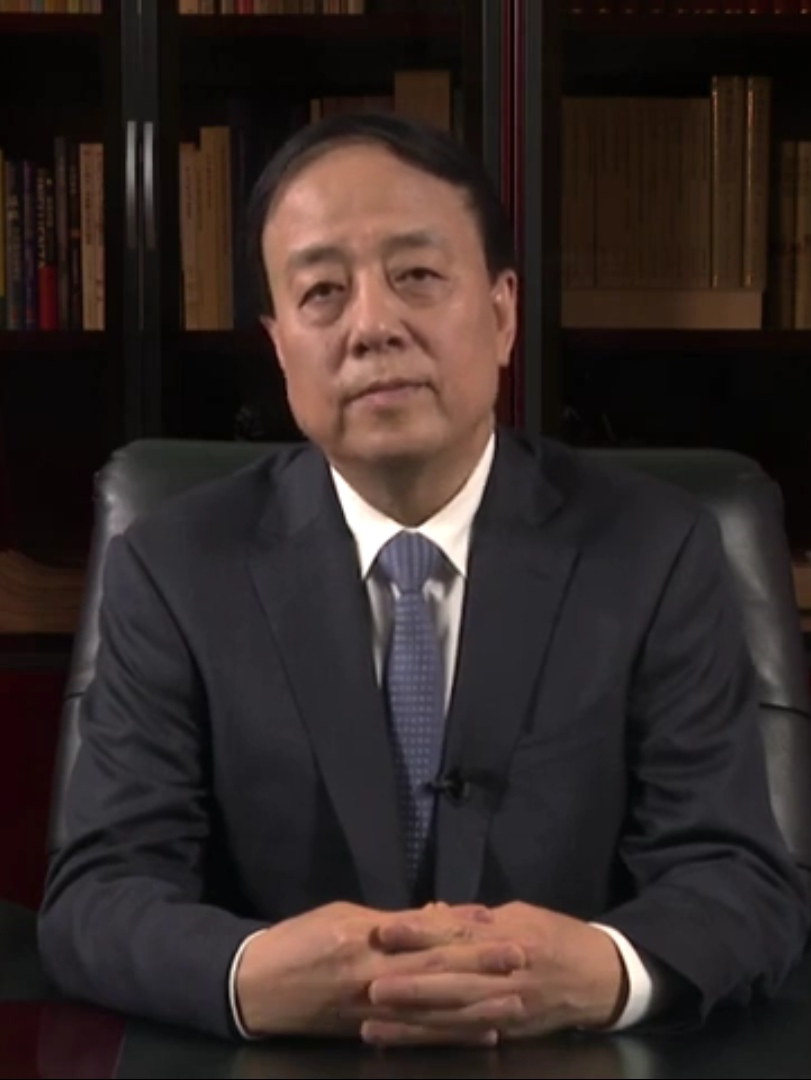

Vice Chairman of the Standing Committee of the National People's Congress
- Incumbent
- Assumed office 17 March 2018
- Chairman: Li Zhanshu; Zhao Leji

Chairman of the Jiusan Society
- Incumbent
- Assumed office 7 December 2017
- Preceded by: Han Qide

Personal details
- Born: 6 September 1956 (age 70) Linfen, Shanxi, China
- Party: Jiusan Society
- Education: Shanxi University; Rutgers University (PhD)
- Scientific career
- Fields: Plant cell physiology, molecular biology
- Workplaces: China Agricultural University

Wu Weihua (Chinese: 武维华; pinyin: Wǔ Wéihuá; born September 1956) is a Chinese politician, professor, and scientist who is a Vice Chair of the Standing Committee of the National People's Congress in the 14th National People's Congress and chair of the Jiusan Society. He works in the fields of plant cell physiology and molecular biology and is a professor at China Agricultural University.

== Early life ==
Wu Weihua was born in Linfen, China, on 6 September 1956. He is Han Chinese. He graduated from Shanxi University after attending from 1978 to 1982, the Shanghai Institute of Plant Physiology with a master's degree after attending from 1982 to 1984, and Rutgers University with a doctorate after attending from 1989 to 1991. He conducted postdoctoral research at Harvard University from 1991 to 1993.

== Career ==
=== Academic ===
Wu was elected as a member of the Chinese Academy of Sciences in 2007. He has worked in the fields of plant cell physiology and molecular biology. He lectured at China Agricultural University from 1984 to 1987, and has been professor there since 1994. He was dean of the College of Life Sciences at China Agricultural University.

=== Politics ===
From 2011 to 2012, Wu was deputy director of the Beijing Municipal Rural Work Committee.

Wu joined the Jiusan Society (JS) in 2010. He was a member of the JS's 12th Central Committee, vice chair of its 13th Central Committee, and chair of its 14th Central Committee. He was Vice Chair of the Standing Committee of the National People's Congress in the 14th National People's Congress. He attended the inauguration of Argentine President Javier Milei on 10 December 2023.

On 7 December 2020, pursuant to Executive Order 13936, the United States Department of the Treasury imposed sanctions on all 14 Vice Chairpersons of the National People's Congress, including Wu, for "undermining Hong Kong's autonomy and restricting the freedom of expression or assembly."

== Works cited ==
- "习近平主席特使武维华将出席阿根廷总统就职仪式". Jiusan Society. 7 December 2023. Archived from the original on 17 May 2025.
- "九三学社中央主席 武维华". Jiusan Society. Archived from the original on 23 December 2017.
- "武维华". Chinese Academy of Sciences. Archived from the original on 24 June 2025.
- "Brief introduction of vice chairpersons, secretary-general of 14th NPC Standing Committee". Government of China. 11 March 2023. Archived from the original on 24 June 2025.
- "Hong Kong-related Designations". United States Department of the Treasury. 7 December 2020. Archived from the original on 24 June 2025.
