= Zhou Peiyuan =

Chinese theoretical physicist and politician

- 周培源
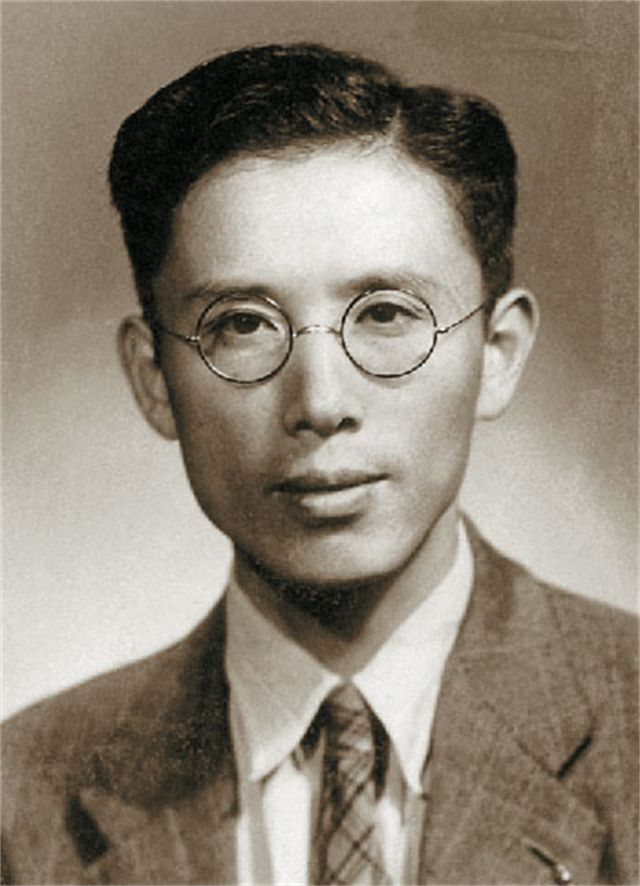

Chairman of the Jiusan Society
- In office 1987–1992
- Preceded by: Xu Deheng
- Succeeded by: Wu Jieping

President of Peking University
- In office July 1978 – March 1981
- Preceded by: Lu Ping
- Succeeded by: Zhang Longxiang

Personal details
- Born: August 28, 1902 Yixing, Jiangsu, Qing China
- Died: November 24, 1993 (aged 91) Beijing Hospital, Beijing, China
- Party: Jiusan Society
- Spouse: Wang Dicheng
- Education: Tsinghua University; University of Chicago (B.S., M.S.); California Institute of Technology (Ph.D.)
- Scientific career
- Known for: Reynolds-averaged Navier Stokes equations
- Fields: Physics
- Workplaces: Peking University; Swiss Federal Institute of Technology Zurich; University of Leipzig; Institute for Advanced Study
- Thesis: The Gravitational Field of a Body with Rotational Symmetry in Einstein's Theory of Gravitation (1928)
- Doctoral advisor: Eric Temple Bell

Zhou Peiyuan (Chinese: 周培源; Wade–Giles: Chou P'ei-yüan; August 28, 1902 – November 24, 1993) was a Chinese theoretical physicist and politician. He served as president of Peking University, and was an academician of the Chinese Academy of Sciences (CAS).

== Biography ==
Born in Yixing, Jiangsu, China, Zhou graduated from Tsinghua University in 1924. Then he went to the United States and obtained a bachelor's degree from University of Chicago in spring of 1926, and a master's degree at the end of the same year. In 1928, he obtained his doctorate degree from California Institute of Technology under Eric Temple Bell with thesis The Gravitational Field of a Body with Rotational Symmetry in Einstein's Theory of Gravitation. In 1936, he studied general relativity under Albert Einstein in the Institute for Advanced Study in Princeton, New Jersey. He did his post-doc researches in quantum mechanics at University of Leipzig in Germany and Swiss Federal Institute of Technology Zurich. He was a professor of physics at Peking University, and later served as the president of the University. He was elected as a founding member of CAS in 1955.

Zhou was made the head of the China Association for Science and Technology when it returned to normal function after the disruptions of the Cultural Revolution.

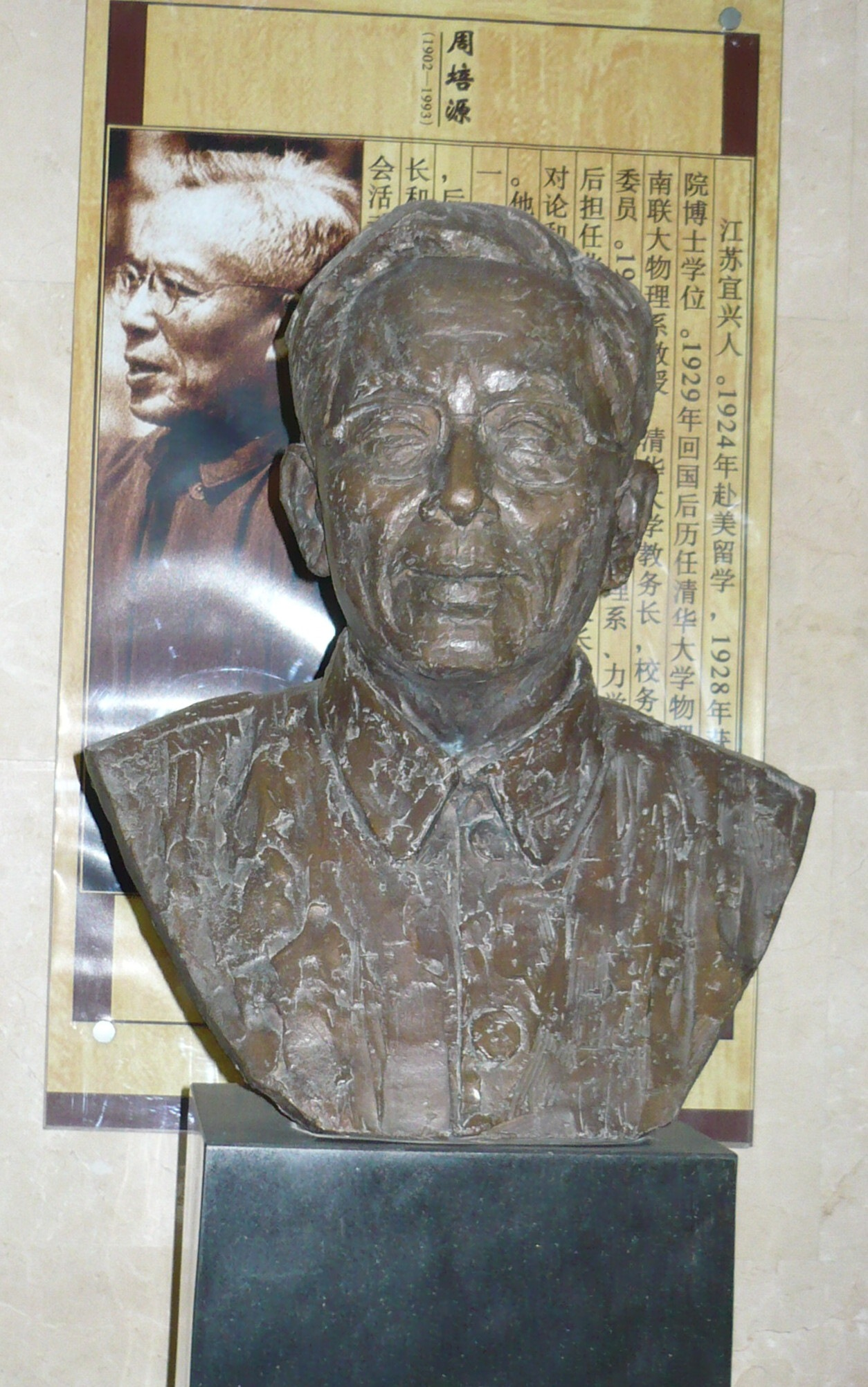
Bronze bust of Zhou Peiyuan at Department of Physics, Peking University

Tsinghua University's Zhou Pei-Yuan Center for Applied Mathematics is named in his honor. In 2003, a bronze statue of Zhou was unveiled on the campus of Peking University.

Zhou's most famous work is the transport equation of Reynolds stress.

Educational offices
Preceded by Lu Ping	President of Peking University; 1978–1981	Succeeded by Zhang Longxiang
Party political offices
Preceded by Xu Deheng	Chairman of Jiusan Society; 1987–1992	Succeeded by Wu Jieping
