= Center for Advancing Innovation =

- Founded: 2012
- Founder: Rosemarie Truman
- Purpose: Technology Transfer and Commercialization
- Location: Bethesda, Maryland
- Method: Challenge competitions, research, consulting
- Key people: Rosemarie Truman, President
- Website: Official website

The Center for Advancing Innovation is a registered 501(c)(3) non-profit organization based in Bethesda, Maryland focused on accelerating technology transfer and commercialization, especially in biotechnology. It was founded by Rosemarie Truman, a consultant and former VP of Global Strategy at Marsh & McLennan.

The Center organizes "challenges" in which experts judge hundreds of promising technologies and research projects in such areas as breast cancer and nanotechnology. It recently announced a new challenge for 2017 called "Space Race" in partnership with NASA and the Medical Center of the Americas Foundation.

The Washington Post reported that the Center has “helped launch 32 biotechnology start-ups in the three years since its pilot competition."

The Center was a recipient of a first-ever “Excellence in Federal Challenge & Prize Competition” award from the U.S. General Services Administration in the category of “Best in Business Plans/Entrepreneurship” for the Breast Cancer Startup Challenge it organized with the National Cancer Institute and Avon Foundation for Women. The Center’s efforts led to 478 people being trained in the “business of science” and entrepreneurship.
