= Technology brokering =

The idea of technology brokering is to span multiple industries, and to see how existing technologies could be used to create breakthrough innovations in other markets. Technology brokering requires companies to be strong in two areas. As Andrew Hargadon, technology brokering's founder, summarized: "Firstly, the company must have the ability to bridge distant communities, usually when a company can move easily across a range of different markets they have a better view of how technologies can be used in new ways. Secondly, technology brokering involves creating new markets and industries from innovative combinations of existing technology. These two strengths are difficult to have simultaneously because the strong ties the companies have with customers and supplies in one industry prevent the company from moving easily into other markets and experimenting with new ideas."

Technology brokering can teach firms how to effectively shift the focus of traditional R&D teams from trying to invent completely new products to combining previous innovations. New ideas for observation based research pull R&D scientists out of the lab and place them into direct consumer observation to allow them to diagnose problems with products and identify the needs of the customer more accurately. The technology brokering process intertwines with the idea of empathic design, which is basically understanding products from a customer's point of view and then designing them to fit needs and issues. The advantage of empathic design, especially when combined with technology brokering firms, is that it leads to innovative products that suit the particular problems of the customer. Another perk of empathic design is including marketing and manufacturing people in the product design to get diverse opinions of product success and practicality.

== History ==
The first examples of technology brokering can be found as early as 1876 with Thomas Edison in his Menlo Park laboratory. In six years, this lab procured over 400 patents. Henry Ford is famous for the Model T automobile and the assembly line, but Ford himself stated that:

"I invented nothing new. I simply assembled into a car the discoveries of other men behind whom were centuries of work….Had I worked fifty or ten or even five years before, I would have failed. So it is with every new thing. Progress happens when all the factors that make for it are ready, and then it is inevitable. To teach that a comparatively few men are responsible for the greatest forward steps of mankind is the worst sort of nonsense."

Companies such as IDEO have their processes compared to Edison's operations of the Menlo Park laboratory. Since IDEO's founding in 1978, it has created 3,000 new products in over 40 industries. CEO of IDEO David Kelley stated about working in many different fields:

"Working with companies in such dissimilar industries as medical instruments, furniture, toys and computers has given us a broad view of the latest technologies available and has taught us how to do quality product development and how to do it quickly and efficiently."

== See also ==
- Technology transfer
