= Edmondo Sanjust di Teulada =

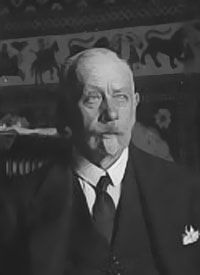

Edmondo Sanjust di Teulada (Cagliari, February 21, 1858 – Rome, September 5, 1936) was an Italian engineer and politician. He was appointed senator of the Kingdom of Italy.

== Biography ==
He belonged to an aristocratic Sardinian family of Catalan origins. He was councillor in Cagliari, and in 1904 became life member of the World Association for Waterborne Transport Infrastructure in Bruxelles. In 1909 was appointed member of the executive committee for the Milan International EXPO.

In 1909 developed the regulatory plan of Rome, which established the first expansion of the city outside the Aurelian Walls.

Between 1919 and 1920 was undersecretary of state at the Ministry of Maritime and Rail Transport; since September 18, 1924, he was general chairman of the Alto Consiglio dei Lavori Pubblici.

== Bibliography ==
- Vito Fiorellini, Edmondo Sanjust di Teulada. Legge Zanardelli per la Basilicata, leggi per la Sardegna, piani regolatori, Potenza, Società Tipografica Editrice Sud e Regione Basilicata, 2010. ISBN 9788-8896-9313-1.
