= William J. Abernathy =

American academic (1933–1983)

- Born: November 13, 1933; Columbia, Tennessee, U.S.
- Died: December 29, 1983 (aged 50); Boston, Massachusetts, U.S.
- Education: University of Tennessee; Harvard Business School
- Known for: Dominant design
- Scientific career
- Institutions: Harvard University

William J. Abernathy (November 21, 1933 – December 29, 1983) was an American professor at the Harvard Business School. With his empirical studies of the automobile industry, Abernathy contributed to explaining the industrial decline of the US automobile industry and influenced management thinking to pay more attention to innovation and long-term strategic decision making.

== Early life ==
William J. Abernathy was born on November 21, 1933, in Columbia, Tennessee. He graduated from the University of Tennessee with a degree in electrical engineering. He went on to receive a master's degree in Business Administration degree in 1964 and a doctorate degree in 1967 from the Harvard Business School. One of his mentors was Professor Wickham Skinner.

== Career ==
He was the first William Barclay Harding Professor of Management and Technology at the Graduate School of Business Administration.

With his colleagues, he was among the first who pointed out that the management of the US industry was to blame for industrial decline instead of emerging Japanese competition or increasing labor struggles. In his research, Abernathy studied the automobile industry and emphasised the intermingled relation between product and production. Introducing the notion of the 'productivity dilemma', he criticised the focus of US managers on short term profits at the expense of innovation and technological competitiveness.

Abernathy was an early key contributor to the influential International Motor Vehicle Program. His influence on European researchers, among others, is noticeable in that his critique of the dominating mass production was readily picked up and extended to inform theories on innovation and integrated product design.

== Personal life ==
He was married to Claire Abernathy. They had two daughters, Evelyn and Jannine. They resided in Lexington, Massachusetts.

== Death ==
He died on December 29, 1983, in Boston, Massachusetts.
