= National Technology Transfer and Advancement Act =

The National Technology Transfer and Advancement Act (NTTAA; United States Public Law 104-113) was signed into law March 7, 1996. The Act amended several existing acts and mandated new directions for federal agencies with the purpose of:

- bringing technology and industrial innovation to market more quickly
- encouraging cooperative research and development between business and the federal government by providing access to federal laboratories
- making it easier for businesses to obtain exclusive licenses to technology and inventions that result from cooperative research with the federal government

The Act made a direct impact on the development of new industrial and technology standards by requiring that all Federal agencies use cooperatively developed standards, particularly those developed by standards developing organizations.
