= University technology transfer offices =

University technology transfer offices (TTOs), or technology licensing offices (TLOs), are responsible for technology transfer and other aspects of the commercialization of research that takes place in a university. TTOs engage in a variety of commercial activities that are meant to facilitate the process of bringing research developments to market, often acting as a channel between academia and industry. Most major research universities have established TTOs in the past decades in an effort to increase the impact of university research and provide opportunities for financial gain. While TTOs are commonplace, many studies have questioned their financial benefit to the university.

== History ==
The history of technology transfer is intimately linked with the history of the science policy of the United States. The foundation for modern American science policy laid way out in Vannevar Bush's letter in response to President Roosevelt's query about whether the US should maintain the high level of research funding it had been pouring into the Office of Scientific Research and Development, which had coordinated large private-public partnership research projects as part of the war effort, including the Manhattan Project. Bush's answer was Science - the Endless Frontier. In that letter, Bush advocated that the US should continue to fund basic research at high levels, arguing that while the US no longer had a geographic frontier, extending the boundaries of science would allow the creation of new technologies, which in turn would spur new industries, create jobs, generate wealth, and maintain US power. As the US worked out its approach to funding science in the 1950s, Congress decided that the federal government should maintain ownership of patents on inventions funded by the federal government.

Federal research funding drove the growth of the research university. Many universities in the early 20th century did not engage in patenting and licensing, since the government owned most inventions, and out of fear of interfering with their missions of supporting the growth of knowledge and objective inquiry. Prior to the postwar period, universities relied mostly on external patent management organizations such as the Research Corporation, while few set up their own research foundations that were independent from but affiliated to the university. Some universities, such as Stanford University and the University of Wisconsin, had active licensing programs of their own. There was a shift in universities' approaches to technology transfer between 1970 and 1980. During this period, universities began taking commercialization efforts into their own hands and setting up TTOs.

The Bayh–Dole Act of 1980 led many US universities to set up tech transfer offices. The Act was created to try to spur the stagnant US economy of the 1970s, harking back to Vannevar Bush's vision of the role of federal research funding in the US economy. The Act decentralized ownership of inventions funded with federal grants, allowing universities that received federal grant funding to maintain ownership of such inventions, obligating them to try to patent and license the inventions to US companies, and requiring universities to share license income with inventors.

== Functions ==
While the broad goal of TTOs is to commercialize university research, they engage in numerous activities that not only bring these developments to market but also encourage and support faculty and students in the entire technology transfer process. Such encouragement may increase the chances of faculty and students creating research developments that can be commercialized. Some of the major functions of TTOs include:

=== Industry partnerships ===
An important task of many TTOs is to create and maintain industry partnerships that may be crucial for collaboration and bringing technologies to market. Some universities such as MIT and Northwestern have separate offices for industry and corporate relations which typically work in conjunction with the TTO of the institution. In this case, TTOs often exploit the relationships developed by the corporate relations office, focusing more specifically on the technology transfer process itself. TTOs often employ two methods when engaging with industry partners: 1) the "pull" method, in which TTOs receive interest from industry partners in bringing specific technologies at the university to market, and 2) the "push" method, in which TTOs actively seek industry partners for this purpose.

=== Intellectual property ===
The Bayh-Dole Act obligated universities to seek patent protection, when appropriate, for inventions to which they elect title; after passage of the Bayh-Dole Act many US universities created intellectual property policies that obligated faculty to assign inventions to the university. Universities typically license the patent to a company that will invest money in developing the invention into a product, which it will then be able to sell at a premium, recouping its investment and making profit before the patent expires.

=== Counseling and incubation for startups ===
TTOs at many universities often provide general business and legal counseling to foster entrepreneurship among faculty and students. By providing resources, funding, and connections to university spin-off companies, TTOs attempt to increase the chances of startup success, which may result in financial gain if the university owns the intellectual property of the invention or has an equity stake in the company. Hence, many TTOs establish business incubators and programs for faculty and students in an attempt to enhance the entrepreneurial atmosphere among researchers at the university. Some examples of such incubators and programs include the Blavatnik Biomedical Accelerator as well as the Physical Sciences and Engineering Accelerator at Harvard University, and Fab Lab MSI, affiliated with the University of Chicago. Research has suggested that incubators at TTOs have not had a high incidence of technology transfer, despite this being one of the reasons they were established, and may even negatively impact the success of TTOs and technology transfer at the university.

== Structure and organization ==
The structure and organization of TTOs can affect its overall performance and can vary among universities. Since TTOs deal with both academic research and industry, they consist of a diverse set of individuals, including scientists, lawyers, analysts, licensing experts, and business managers. By having individuals (particularly different scientists, engineers, and analysts) with varying sets of expertise in research, TTOs attempt to more effectively assess, protect, and profit from the research developments taking place in multiple disciplines throughout the university.

TTOs can by classified into three different types:

- internal: existing as an integrated part of the university and controlled by university administration
- external: existing as an independent company that does not operate under the control of university administration
- mixed: having components of both internal and external TTOs

As of 2012 the "internal" type was most common in the US.

TTOs of different universities can also collaborate between them to grow, thus originating new organizational structures. Such structures are:

- Network structure: the existing organizational forms of each TTO are maintained and the single organizations operate together in a virtual manner creating a subset of links between the existing TTOs involved in the consortium
- Strong Hub structure: a new central TTO is created and it works for each university involved in the consortium
- Light Hub structure: a new central TTO with the functions of a hub is created, but each university involved in the consortium maintains internally some technology transfer activities in a dedicated internal office.

== Strategies ==
TTOs attempt to capitalize on the research developments made at the university by employing strategies focused on providing the university with opportunities for financial gain and increased research impact. A common strategy that TTOs engage in is licensing their inventions, either to an industry partner or back to the university inventor if the inventor started a company (i.e. a university spin-off). Through this approach, TTOs can bring university technologies to market without having to engage in production and distribution themselves. TTOs can also take an equity stake in the spin-off company rather than licensing the technology. Some research has suggested that equity in spin-off companies may provide higher returns than licensing, but this strategy seems to be more common with TTOs that are financially independent from the parent university (i.e. external TTO structure). While these strategies vary greatly among TTOs at different universities, a majority of them employ some combination of licensing and equity stakes, with licensing being a more standard practice.

== International diffusion and TTOs outside the US ==
As many major research universities across the US began to adopt TTOs, institutions outside the US became attracted to the idea of taking control of their commercialization activities as well. Prior to the 2000s, many German-speaking and Scandinavian countries had a policy of "professor's privilege", in which faculty retain the right to control the intellectual property of their inventions. In addition, in recent years many OECD and EU nations have created legislation that emulates Bayh-Dole, in an attempt to increase the commercialization activities and impact of their respective research universities. Denmark was among the first to abolish professor's privilege, followed by Germany, Austria, Norway and Finland between 2000 and 2007. Countries such as France and the UK, which already had policies in place that grant intellectual property rights to universities during this period, began heavily encouraging and enforcing these institutional ownership rights. As of 2011, most European countries grant universities the rights to the intellectual property of inventions developed by faculty researchers, yet a few countries such as Italy and Sweden still employ professor's privilege. Hence, there has been a marked increase in the commercialization activities of universities and creation of TTOs in Europe.

Several Asian countries such as Japan, China, and India have also shifted towards a Bayh-Dole type legislation, although some countries such as Malaysia have a shared ownership model. Moreover, there has been a general shift towards increased commercialization and the establishment of TTOs across higher education institutions in Asian countries.

== Criticisms ==
Although universities created TTOs with hopes of financial gain, many TTOs have retained losses in their commercialization activities and have not generated significant local economic development. It has been argued that protecting intellectual property and patenting is a costly process, and of all the patents and licenses a university issues, there may be a limited number of inventions that actually yield enough revenue to cover or surpass these costs. Research has shown that larger, more established TTOs are sufficiently profitable, whereas many smaller, more recent TTOs are not, and that an estimated half of TTOs retain losses in their commercialization activities (of those that do not have losses, a majority do no better than to cover their costs). Even the most profitable TTOs only produce revenue that amounts to 1-3% of the total research expenditures at the university. Moreover, less than 1% of licensed technologies actually yield over $1M in revenue. Another criticism of TTOs is its role in the research atmosphere of the university, with many scholars arguing that its presence and purpose of engaging in commercialization activities conflicts with a university's mission of furthering knowledge and objective academic inquiry.

Rebecca Eisenberg and Michael Heller have argued that the Bayh-Dole Act spurred university tech transfer offices to become too aggressive in patenting, creating patent thickets and a tragedy of the anticommons especially in the field of biomedical research. As of 2012, evidence for such an anticommons effect in the practice of biomedical science was lacking.

== See also ==
- Intellectual property policy
- Tethelin
