= Association of European Science and Technology Transfer Professionals =

The Association of European Science and Technology Transfer Professionals (ASTP: A World of Knowledge Transfer, formerly known as ASTP-Proton) is the European members association for knowledge and technology transfer professionals.

Located in Leiden in the Netherlands, ASTP is the premier, pan-European association for professionals involved in knowledge transfer among universities and industry. By promoting and professionalising knowledge transfer practice, the association aims to enhance the impact of public research on society and the economy.

== Members ==
Central to the European knowledge transfer ecosystem, ASTP over 900 members from 45+ countries (May 2019).

== History ==
Created in 1999, through the initiative of a multinational group of technology transfer professionals, ASTP is a non-profit organisation based in Leiden, Netherlands.

== Activities ==
Through training courses and annual conferences, the group aims to professionalise and promote technology and knowledge transfer among universities, public research organisations, and industry.
