= Technology transfer =

Process of disseminating technology

Technology transfer (TT), also called transfer of technology (TOT), is the process of transferring (disseminating) technology from the person or organization that owns or holds it to another person or organization, in an attempt to transform inventions and scientific outcomes into new products and services that benefit society. Technology transfer is closely related to (and may arguably be considered a subset of) knowledge transfer.

A comprehensive definition of technology transfer today includes the notion of collaborative process as it became clear that global challenges could be resolved only through the development of global solutions. Knowledge and technology transfer plays a crucial role in connecting innovation stakeholders and moving inventions from creators to public and private users.

Intellectual property (IP) is an important instrument of technology transfer, as it establishes an environment conducive to sharing research results and technologies. Analysis in 2003 showed that the context, or environment, and motives of each organization involved will influence the method of technology transfer employed. The motives behind the technology transfer were not necessarily homogenous across organization levels, especially when commercial and government interests are combined. The protection of IP rights enables all parties, including universities and research institutions to ensure ownership of the scientific outcomes of their intellectual activity, and to control the use of IP in accordance with their mission and core values. IP protection gives academic institutions capacity to market their inventions, attract funding, seek industrial partners and assure dissemination of new technologies through means such as licensing or creation of start-ups for the benefit of society.

== In practice ==
Technology transfers may occur between universities, businesses (of any size, ranging from small, medium, to large), governments, across geopolitical borders, both formally and informally, and both openly and secretly. Often it occurs by concerted effort to share skills, knowledge, technologies, manufacturing methods, samples, and facilities among the participants.

While the Technology transfer process involves many activities, which can be represented in many ways, in reality, technology transfer is a fluid and dynamic process that rarely follows a linear course. Typical steps include:

- Knowledge creation
- Disclosure
- Assessment and evaluation (Intellectual property analytics and Intellectual Property Valuation)
- IP protection
- Fundraising and technology development
- Marketing
- Commercialization
- Product development, and
- Impact.

Technology transfer aims to ensure that scientific and technological developments are accessible to a wider range of users who can then further develop and exploit the technology into new products, processes, applications, materials, or services. It is closely related to (and may arguably be considered a subset of) knowledge transfer. Horizontal transfer is the movement of technologies from one area to another.

Transfer of technology is primarily horizontal. Vertical transfer occurs when technologies are moved from applied research centers to research and development departments.

=== Spin-outs ===
Spin-outs are used where the host organization does not have the necessary will, resources, or skills to develop new technology. Often these approaches are associated with raising of venture capital (VC) as a means of funding the development process, a practice common in the United States and the European Union. Research spin-off companies are a popular vehicle of commercialization in Canada, where the rate of licensing of Canadian university research remains far below that of the US. Local venture capital organizations such as the Mid-Atlantic Venture Association (MAVA) also sponsor conferences at which investors assess the potential for commercialization of technology.

Technology brokers are people who discovered how to bridge the emergent worlds and apply scientific concepts or processes to new situations or circumstances. A related term, used almost synonymously, especially in Europe, is "technology valorisation". While conceptually the practice has been utilized for many years (in ancient times, Archimedes was notable for applying science to practical problems), the present-day volume of research, combined with high-profile failures at Xerox PARC and elsewhere, has led to a focus on the process itself.

Whereas technology transfer can involve the dissemination of highly complex technology from capital-intensive origins to low-capital recipients (and can involve aspects of dependency and fragility of systems), it also can involve appropriate technology, not necessarily high-tech or expensive, that is better disseminated, yielding robustness and independence of systems.

=== Informal promotion ===
Technology transfer is also promoted through informal means, such as at conferences organized by various groups, including the Ewing Marion Kauffman Foundation and the Association of University Technology Managers (AUTM), and at "challenge" competitions by organizations such as the Center for Advancing Innovation in Maryland. AUTM represents over 3,100 technology transfer professionals, and more than 800 universities, research centers, hospitals, businesses and government organizations.

The most frequently used informal means of technology transfer are through education, studies, professional exchange of opinions, movement of people, seminars, workshops. .

There are numerous professional associations and TTO Networks enhancing different forms of collaboration among technology managers in order to facilitate this "informal" transfer of best practices and experiences.

In addition to AUTM, other regional and international associations include the Association of European Science and Technology Transfer Professionals (ASTP), the Alliance of Technology Transfer Professionals (ATTP), Licensing Executives Society (LES), Praxis Auril and others. There are also national technology transfer associations and networks, such as the National Association of Technology Transfer Offices in Mexico (Red OTT Mexico), the Brazilian Forum of Innovation and Technology Transfer Managers (FORTEC), the Alliance of TechTransfer Professionals of the Philippines (AToP), the South African Research and Innovation Management Association (SARIMA), and other associations.

They promote cooperation in technology transfer and the exchange of best practices and experiences among professionals, as today international technology transfer is considered one of the most effective ways to bring people together to find solutions to global problems such as COVID-19, climate change or cyber-attacks.

=== IP policies ===
Universities and research institutions seeking to partner with industry or other organizations can adopt an institutional intellectual property policy for effective intellectual property management and technology transfer. Such policies provide structure, predictability, and an environment, in which commercialization partners (industrial sponsors, consultants, non-profit organizations, SMEs, governments) and research stakeholders (researchers, technicians, students, visiting researchers, etc.) can access and share knowledge, technology and IP. National IP strategies are measures taken by a government to realize its IP policy objectives.

== Organizations ==
A research result may be of scientific and commercial interest, but patents are normally only issued for practical processes, and so someone—not necessarily the researchers—must come up with a specific practical process. Another consideration is commercial value; for example, while there are many ways to accomplish nuclear fusion, the ones of commercial value are those that generate more energy than they require to operate. The process to commercially exploit research varies widely. It can involve licensing agreements or setting up joint ventures and partnerships to share both the risks and rewards of bringing new technologies to market. Other corporate vehicles, e.g. spin-outs, are used where the host organization does not have the necessary will, resources, or skills to develop new technology. Often these approaches are associated with raising of venture capital (VC) as a means of funding the development process. Research spin-off companies are a popular vehicle of commercialization in Canada, where the rate of licensing of Canadian university research remains far below that of the US.

Scholars Jeffrey Stoff and Alex Joske have argued that the Chinese Communist Party's united front "influence apparatus intersects with or directly supports its global technology transfer apparatus."

=== Technology transfer offices ===
Many universities and research institutions, and governmental organizations now have an Office of Technology Transfer (TTO, also known as "Tech Transfer" or "TechXfer") dedicated to identifying research that has potential commercial interest and strategies for how to exploit it. Technology transfer offices are usually created within a university in order to manage IP assets of the university, and the transfer of knowledge and technology to industry. Sometimes, their mandate includes any interaction or contractual relation with the private sector, or other responsibilities, depending on the mission of the institutions. Common names for such offices differ. Some examples include Technology Licensing Office (TLO), Technology Management Office, Research Contracts and IP Services Office, Technology Transfer Interface, Industry Liaisons Office, IP and Technology Management Office, and Nucleus of Technological Innovation.

Technology transfer offices may work on behalf of research institutions, governments, and even large multinationals. Where start-ups and spin-outs are the clients, commercial fees are sometimes waived in lieu of an equity stake in the business. As a result of the potential complexity of the technology transfer process, technology transfer organizations are often multidisciplinary, including economists, engineers, lawyers, marketers and scientists. The dynamics of the technology transfer process have attracted attention in their own right, and there are several dedicated societies and journals.

=== Technology and Innovation Support Centers ===
Technology and Innovation Support Centers (TISCs) help innovators access patent information, scientific and technical literature and search tools and databases and make more effective use of these resources to promote innovation, technology transfer, commercialization and utilization of technologies. The WIPO TISCs program currently supports over 80 countries. WIPO supports its member states in establishing and developing TISCs in universities and other institutions in numerous countries around the world. Services offered by TISCs may include:

- access to online patent and non-patent (scientific and technical) resources and IP-related publications;
- assistance in searching and retrieving technology information;
- training in database search;
- on-demand searches (novelty, state-of-the-art and infringement);
- monitoring technology and competitors;
- basic information on industrial property laws, management and strategy, and technology commercialization and marketing.

=== Science technology parks ===
Science and technology parks (STP) are territories usually affiliated with a university or a research institution, which accommodate and foster the growth of companies based therein through technology transfer and open innovation.

=== Technology incubators ===
Technology business incubators (TBIs) are organizations that help startup companies and individual entrepreneurs develop their businesses by providing a range of services, including training, brokering and financing.

=== IP marketplaces ===
Intellectual Property marketplaces are Internet-based platforms that allow innovators to connect with potential partners and/or clients. For example, online platform WIPO GREEN enable collaborations in specific areas of knowledge transfer and facilitate matchmaking between technology providers and technology seekers.

== Government and intellectual property support ==
There has been a marked increase in technology transfer intermediaries specialized in their field since 1980, stimulated in large part by the Bayh–Dole Act and equivalent legislation in other countries, which provided additional incentives for research exploitation. Due to the increasing focus on technology transfer there are several forms of intermediary institutions at work in this sector, from TTOs to IP 'trolls' that act outside the Bayh–Dole Act provisions. Due to the risk of exploitation, intellectual property policy, training and systems support for technology transfer by government, research institutes and universities, have been international and regionally-focused organisation, such as the World Intellectual Property Organisation and the European Union.

=== Partnership intermediaries ===
The U.S. government's annual budget funds over $100 billion in research and development activity, which leads to a continuous pipeline of new inventions and technologies from within government laboratories. Through legislation including the Bayh–Dole Act, Congress encourages the private sector to use those technologies with commercial potential through technology transfer mechanisms such as Cooperative Research and Development Agreements, Patent License Agreements, Educational Partnership Agreements, and state/local government partnerships.

The term "partnership intermediary" means an agency of a state or local government—or a nonprofit entity owned, chartered, funded, or operated by or on behalf of a state or local government—that assists, counsels, advises, evaluates, or otherwise cooperates with small business firms; institutions of higher education defined in section 201(a) of the Higher Education Act of 1965 (20 USC § 1141 [a]); or educational institutions within the meaning of section 2194 of Title 10, United States Code, that need or can make demonstrably productive use of technology-related assistance from a federal laboratory, including state programs receiving funds under cooperative agreements entered into under section 5121 of the Omnibus Trade and Competitiveness Act of 1988 (15 USC § 2781).

== During the COVID-19 pandemic ==
Technology transfer had a direct impact on contributing to global public health issues, by enabling global access to COVID-19 vaccines. During 2021, vaccine developers concluded over 200 technology transfer agreements. One example was AstraZeneca concluding the licensing and technology transfer agreements on AstraZeneca with the Serum Institute of India and with Daiichi Sankyo of Japan to supply vaccines for COVID-19, which were developed in collaboration with the University of Oxford. In this process Intellectual Property was part of the solution and an important tool for facilitation of affordable global access to COVID 19 treatments – as it was the case in two licensing agreements between Medicines Patent Pool (MPP) and pharmaceutical companies Merck and Pfizer.

== Drawbacks ==
Despite incentives to move research into production, the practical aspects are sometimes difficult to perform in practice. Using DoD technology readiness levels as a criterion (for example), research tends to focus on TRL (technology readiness level) 1–3 while readiness for production tends to focus on TRL 6–7 or higher. Bridging TRL-3 to TRL-6 has proven to be difficult in some organizations. Attempting to rush research (prototypes) into production (fully tested under diverse conditions, reliable, maintainable, etc.) tends to be more costly and time-consuming than expected. Power political and realpolitik incentives in technology transfer are cognized to be negative factors in destructive applications.

== See also ==
- Bayh–Dole Act
- Business incubator
- Diffusion of innovations
- Discovery (observation)
- Licensing Executives Society International
- New product development
- Open innovation
- Prior art
- Technology assessment
- Technology licensing office (TLO)
- Tethelin
- Thousand Talents Program

== Sources ==
This article incorporates text from a free content work. Licensed under CC-BY-4.0. Text taken from Intellectual Property and Technology Transfer, WIPO.
