= Outline of knowledge =

Overview of and topical guide to Knowledge

The following outline is provided as an overview of and topical guide to knowledge:

Knowledge is an awareness of facts (descriptive knowledge), a familiarity with individuals and situations (knowledge by acquaintance), or a practical skill (procedural knowledge). Descriptive knowledge, also called propositional knowledge, is often characterized as true belief that is distinct from opinion or guesswork by virtue of justification. While there is wide agreement among philosophers that propositional knowledge is a form of true belief, many controversies focus on justification. This includes questions like how to understand justification, whether it is needed at all, and whether something else besides it is needed. These controversies intensified in the latter half of the 20th century due to a series of thought experiments called Gettier cases that provoked alternative definitions.

Knowledge can be produced in many ways. The main source of empirical knowledge is perception, which involves the usage of the senses to learn about the external world. Introspection allows people to learn about their internal mental states and processes. Other sources of knowledge include memory, rational intuition, inference, and testimony. According to foundationalism, some of these sources are basic in that they can justify beliefs, without depending on other mental states. Coherentists reject this claim and contend that a sufficient degree of coherence among all the mental states of the believer is necessary for knowledge. According to infinitism, an infinite chain of beliefs is needed.

== Types of knowledge ==
=== By form ===
- A priori and a posteriori knowledge – these terms are used with respect to reasoning (epistemology) to distinguish necessary conclusions from first premises.
  - A priori knowledge or justification – knowledge that is independent of experience, as with mathematics, tautologies ("All bachelors are unmarried"), and deduction from pure reason (e.g., ontological proofs). (Note: Galen Strawson has stated that an a priori argument is one in which "you can see that it is true just lying on your couch. You don't have to get up off your couch and go outside and examine the way things are in the physical world. You don't have to do any science.")
  - A posteriori knowledge or justification – knowledge dependent on experience or empirical evidence, as with most aspects of science and personal knowledge.
- Descriptive knowledge – also called declarative knowledge or propositional knowledge, it is the type of knowledge that is, by its very nature, expressed in declarative sentences or indicative propositions (e.g., "Capybaras are rodents", or "It is raining"). This is distinguished from what is commonly known as "know-how" or procedural knowledge (the knowledge of how, and especially how best, to perform some task), and "knowing of", or knowledge by acquaintance (the knowledge of something's existence).
- Experience – knowledge or mastery of an event or subject gained through involvement in or exposure to it.
  - Empirical evidence – also referred to as empirical data, empirical knowledge, and sense experience, it is a collective term for the knowledge or source of knowledge acquired by means of the senses, particularly by observation and experimentation. After Immanuel Kant, it is common in philosophy to call the knowledge thus gained a posteriori knowledge. This is contrasted with a priori knowledge, the knowledge accessible from pure reason alone.
  - Experiential knowledge – knowledge gained through experience.
- Explicit knowledge – knowledge that can be readily articulated, codified, accessed and verbalized. It can be easily transmitted to others. Most forms of explicit knowledge can be stored in certain media. The information contained in encyclopedias and textbooks are good examples of explicit knowledge.
- Extelligence – term coined by Ian Stewart and Jack Cohen in their 1997 book Figments of Reality. They define it as the cultural capital that is available to us in the form of external media (e.g., tribal legends, folklore, nursery rhymes, books, videotapes, CD-ROMs, etc.).
- Knowledge by acquaintance – according to Bertrand Russell, knowledge by acquaintance is obtained through a direct causal (experience-based) interaction between a person and the object that person is perceiving. Sense-data from that object are the only things that people can ever become acquainted with; they can never truly KNOW the physical object itself. The distinction between "knowledge by acquaintance" and "knowledge by description" was promoted by Russell (notably in his 1905 paper On Denoting). Russell was extremely critical of the equivocal nature of the word "know", and believed that the equivocation arose from a failure to distinguish between the two fundamentally different types of knowledge.
- Libre knowledge – knowledge released in such a way that users are free to read, listen to, watch, or otherwise experience it; to learn from or with it; to copy, adapt and use it for any purpose; and to share the work (unchanged or modified). Whilst shared tacit knowledge is regarded as implicitly libre, (explicit) libre knowledge is defined as a generalisation of the libre software definition.
- Procedural knowledge – also known as imperative knowledge, it is the knowledge exercised in the performance of some task. Commonly referred to as "knowing-how" and opposed to "knowing-that" (descriptive knowledge).
- Tacit knowledge – kind of knowledge that is difficult to transfer to another person by means of writing it down or verbalizing it. For example, that London is in the United Kingdom is a piece of explicit knowledge that can be written down, transmitted, and understood by a recipient. However, the ability to speak a language, knead dough, play a musical instrument or design and use complex equipment requires all sorts of knowledge that is not always known explicitly, even by expert practitioners, and which is difficult or impossible to explicitly transfer to other users.
- Threshold knowledge

=== By scope ===
- Common knowledge – knowledge that is known by everyone or nearly everyone, usually with reference to the community in which the term is used.
- Customer knowledge – knowledge for, about, or from customers.
- Domain knowledge – valid knowledge used to refer to an area of human endeavour, an autonomous computer activity, or other specialized discipline.
- Foundational knowledge – the knowledge necessary for understanding or usefully applying further knowledge in a field.
- General knowledge – information that has been accumulated over time through various mediums. This definition excludes highly specialized learning that can only be obtained with extensive training and information confined to a single medium. General knowledge is an important component of crystallized intelligence and is strongly associated with general intelligence, and with openness to experience.
- Metaknowledge – knowledge about knowledge. Bibliographies are a form of metaknowledge. Patterns within scientific literature is another.
- Mutual knowledge – Information known by all participatory agents
- Self-knowledge – information that an individual draws upon when finding an answer to the question "What am I like?".
- Traditional knowledge – knowledge systems embedded in the cultural traditions of regional, indigenous, or local communities. Traditional knowledge includes types of knowledge about traditional technologies of subsistence (e.g. tools and techniques for hunting or agriculture), midwifery, ethnobotany and ecological knowledge, traditional medicine, celestial navigation, ethnoastronomy, the climate, and others. These kinds of knowledge, crucial for subsistence and survival, are generally based on accumulations of empirical observation and on interaction with the environment.
  - Traditional ecological knowledge

== Qualities of knowledge ==
- Half-life of knowledge

=== Structure of knowledge ===
Taxonomies

- Types of subject taxonomies
  - Document classification
  - Library classification
  - Taxonomy for search engines
- Specific taxonomies of knowledge
  - Figurative System of Human Knowledge
  - Propædia – first of three parts of the 15th edition of Encyclopædia Britannica, presenting its Outline of Knowledge.
  - Tree of Knowledge System

== Types of bodies of recorded knowledge ==
- Academic disciplines – branch of knowledge that is taught and researched as part of higher education. A scholar's discipline is commonly defined and recognized by the university faculties and learned societies to which he or she belongs and the academic journals in which he or she publishes research. However, no formal criteria exist for defining an academic discipline.
- Body of knowledge (BOK) – specialized term in knowledge representation meaning the set of concepts, terms and activities that make up a professional domain, as defined by the relevant learned society or professional association.
- Curricula – plural of curriculum, which means the totality of student experiments that occur in the educational process. The term often refers specifically to a planned sequence of instruction, or to a view of planned student's experiences in terms of the educator's or school's instructional goals. Curricula may be tightly standardized, or may include a high level of instructor or learner autonomy. Many countries have national curricula in primary and secondary education, such as the United Kingdom's National Curriculum.
- Encyclopedias – type of reference work or compendium holding a comprehensive summary of information from either all branches of knowledge or a particular branch of knowledge. Encyclopedias are divided into articles or entries, which are usually accessed alphabetically by article name. Encyclopedia entries are longer and more detailed than those in most dictionaries. Generally speaking, unlike dictionary entries, which focus on linguistic information about words, encyclopedia articles focus on factual information concerning the subject for which the article is named.
- Knowledge base
  - Personal knowledge base
- Knowledge commons
- Libraries – a library is a collection of sources of information and similar resources, made accessible to a defined community for reference or borrowing. It provides physical or digital access to material, and may be a physical building or room, or a virtual space, or both. A library's collection can include books, periodicals, newspapers, manuscripts, films, maps, prints, documents, microform, CDs, cassettes, videotapes, DVDs, Blu-ray Discs, e-books, audiobooks, databases, and other formats. Libraries range in size from a few shelves of books to several million items.

== Specific bodies of recorded knowledge, by type ==
- Specific BOKs (bodies of knowledge, in the context of the knowledge representation field)
  - Canadian IT Body of Knowledge
  - Civil Engineering Body of Knowledge
  - Common Body of Knowledge
  - Enterprise Architecture Body of Knowledge
  - Geographic Information Science and Technology Body of Knowledge
  - Project Management Body of Knowledge
  - Software Engineering Body of Knowledge
  - Data Management Body of Knowledge
- Specific encyclopedias
  - Bibliography of encyclopedias
  - List of encyclopedias by branch of knowledge
  - List of encyclopedias by language
  - List of historical encyclopedias
  - List of online encyclopedias
    - Wikipedia – largest encyclopedia in the world. It is a free, web-based, collaborative, multilingual encyclopedia project supported by the non-profit Wikimedia Foundation. Its more than 20 million articles (over 6.89 million in English) have been written collaboratively by volunteers around the world. Almost all of its articles can be edited by anyone with access to the site, and it has about 100,000 regularly active contributors.
- Specific knowledge bases
  - Knowledge Vault – knowledge base created by Google. As of 2014, it contained 1.6 billion facts which had been collated automatically from the Internet.

== Epistemology (philosophy of knowledge) ==
Epistemology – philosophy of knowledge. It is the study of knowledge and justified belief. It questions what knowledge is and how it can be acquired, and the extent to which knowledge pertinent to any given subject or entity can be acquired. Much of the debate in this field has focused on the philosophical analysis of the nature of knowledge and how it relates to connected notions such as truth, belief, and justification.

- DIKW pyramid – theoretical model of the relationship between data, information, knowledge, and wisdom
- Knowledge neglect – failure to apply knowledge
- Theory of knowledge (IB course) – a course related to epistemology

== Management of knowledge ==
Knowledge management (list)

- Chief knowledge officer
- Knowledge balance sheet
- Knowledge ecosystem
- Knowledge mobilization
- Knowledge organization (effort)
  - Knowledge organization system
- Knowledge organization (company or agency)
- Knowledge transfer
- Knowledge worker

=== Obtaining knowledge ===
Methods of obtaining knowledge

- Exploration
  - Space exploration
  - Revelation
  - Research
    - Scientific method
    - Experimentation
- Learning
  - Autodidactism – self-education; act of self-directed learning about a subject or subjects in which one has had little to no formal education.
  - Reading
  - Studying
  - Knowledge building
    - Knowledge building communities

=== Knowledge storage ===
Knowledge can be stored in:

- Books
- Knowledge bases
  - Ontology – formal naming and definition of the types, properties, and interrelationships of the entities that really or fundamentally exist for a particular domain of discourse.
    - Commonsense knowledge base – database containing all the general knowledge that most people possess, represented in a way that it is available to artificial intelligence programs that use natural language or make inferences about the ordinary world.
    - Knowledge graph – another name for ontology
- Knowledge representation (AI)
  - Body of knowledge (BOK) – complete set of concepts, terms and activities that make up a professional domain, as defined by the relevant learned society or professional association
- Libraries
- Memory

=== Knowledge retrieval ===
Knowledge retrieval – Stored knowledge can be retrieved by:

- Knowledge engine
  - WolframAlpha – computational knowledge engine or answer engine developed by Wolfram Research
  - Knowledge Engine (Wikimedia Foundation) – search engine project by the Wikimedia Foundation
  - Google Search – powered by:
    - Google Knowledge Graph – knowledge base used by Google to enhance its search engine's search results with semantic search information gathered from a wide variety of sources
- Knowledge discovery
- Reading

=== Imparting knowledge ===
- Communication – purposeful activity of information exchange between two or more participants in order to convey or receive the intended meanings through a shared system of signs and semiotic rules. The basic steps of communication are the forming of communicative intent, message composition, message encoding, transmission of signal, reception of signal, message decoding and interpretation of the message by the recipient. Examples of methods of communication used to impart knowledge include: Writing and Publishing.
- Education – process of facilitating learning.
  - Educational methods:
    - Storytelling
    - Discussion
    - Teaching
    - Training
    - Directed research
- Knowledge sharing – activity through which knowledge (namely, information, skills, or expertise) is exchanged among people, friends, families, communities (Wikipedia), or organizations.
  - Knowledge café
  - Knowledge transfer
  - Knowledge translation

== History of the knowledge of humanity ==
History of knowledge

- Historiography
- History of exploration
  - History of space exploration
- History of invention
- History of libraries
- History of philosophy
- History of science
- Knowledge deities
- Taxes on knowledge

== Knowledge and society ==
=== Economics of knowledge ===
- Intellectual capital
- Knowledge broker
- Knowledge Economic Index
- Knowledge economy
- Knowledge gap hypothesis
- Knowledge market
  - Knowledge services
- Knowledge spillover
- Knowledge value
- Monopolies of knowledge

=== Politics of knowledge ===
- Access to Knowledge movement
- Knowledge assessment methodology
- Knowledge society
- Local knowledge problem
- Open access
  - Berlin Declaration on Open Access to Knowledge in the Sciences and Humanities
- Scientia potentia est – Latin for "knowledge is power".
- The Cost of Knowledge protest
- World Brain

=== Sociology of knowledge ===
Sociology of knowledge

- Knowledge community
- Knowledge space

== Knowledge technology ==
- Knowledge-based systems
  - Knowledge acquisition
  - Knowledge base
  - Knowledge engineering
    - Knowledge engineer
  - Knowledge extraction
  - Knowledge level
  - Knowledge level modeling
  - Knowledge modeling
- Knowledge management (see above)

== Knowledge of humanity ==
The world's knowledge (knowledge possessed by human civilization):

- Science
  - Formal Sciences
    - Logic
    - Mathematics
    - Computer science (is also Technology)
  - Natural Sciences
    - Physics
    - Astronomy
    - Chemistry
    - Earth Sciences
    - Biology
  - Engineering / Technology
    - Aerospace engineering
    - Biotechnology / Biological engineering
    - Biomedical engineering
    - Chemical engineering
    - Civil engineering
    - Computer science (Formal Science) / Computer engineering
    - Electrical engineering
    - Electronics engineering
    - Environmental engineering
    - Industrial engineering
    - Marine engineering / Naval architecture
    - Materials science and engineering
    - Mechanical engineering
    - Nuclear science and engineering
  - Healthcare sciences
    - Medicine and surgery
    - Dentistry and oral health
    - Veterinary medicine / Veterinary surgery
  - Social sciences
    - Psychology
    - Linguistics / Language
    - Sociology
    - Anthropology
    - Geography (Physical geography)
    - Economics
      - Trade
    - Education
    - Political science
    - Law
      - Jurisprudence
- Humanities and arts
  - Classics
  - Literature
  - Performing arts
    - Theatre
    - Dance
    - Music
  - Visual arts
    - Painting
  - Religion
  - History
  - Philosophy

== Organizations ==
- Institute of Knowledge Transfer
- International Society for Knowledge Organization
- Open Knowledge International

== Publications ==
=== Books ===
- A Guide for the Perplexed by E. F. Schumacher (critique of materialist scientism and an exploration of the nature and organization of knowledge).
- Knowledge and Its Limits.
- Human Knowledge: Its Scope and Limits by Bertrand Russell, a founder of analytic philosophy.
- Outline of Knowledge (part of the Propædia of the 15th edition of Encyclopædia Britannica).

=== Journals ===
- Electronic Journal of Knowledge Management
- Journal of Information & Knowledge Management
- Journal of Information Science
- Journal of Knowledge Management
- Journal of Knowledge Management Practice
- Journal of Web Semantics
- Knowledge Management Research & Practice

== See also ==
- Belief
- Data
- Information
- Truth
- Wisdom
- Knowledge representation and reasoning
- Knowledge building
- Knowledge enterprise
- Empirical knowledge
- Simple Knowledge Organization System
- Encyclopedic knowledge
- Knowledge intensive business services
- Knowledge entrepreneurship
- Institutional memory
- Omniscience
- Knowledge environment
- Personal knowledge management
- Knowledge management software
- Tribal knowledge
- Democratization of knowledge
- Open Knowledge Base Connectivity
- Knowledge integration
- Knowledge triangle
- Curse of knowledge
- Knowledge value chain
- Knowledge ark
- Knowledge building communities
- Knowledge-based theory of the firm
- Forbidden knowledge
- Encapsulated knowledge
- Social knowledge management
- Knowledge compilation
- List of lists of lists

== Works cited ==
- Adams, Kathy L.; Adams, Dale E. (2003). Urban Education: A Reference Handbook. ABC-CLIO. pp. 31–32. ISBN 9781576073629.
- Kelly, A.V. (2009). The Curriculum: theory and practice (6th ed.). ISBN 9781847872746.
- Pickett, Joseph P., ed. (2011). The American Heritage Dictionary of the English Language (5th ed.). Houghton Mifflin. ISBN 978-0-547-04101-8.
