= Ecosystem (disambiguation) =

Ecosystem is a community of living organisms together with the nonliving components of their environment.

By metaphorical extension, the term may also reference:

- Business ecosystem
- Data ecosystem
- Developer ecosystem
- Digital ecosystem
- Entrepreneurship ecosystem
- Information ecosystem
- Knowledge ecosystem
- Platform ecosystem
- Software ecosystem
- Startup ecosystem

== See also ==
- Apple ecosystem
