= Customer knowledge =

Customer knowledge (CK) is the combination of experience, value and insight information which is needed, created and absorbed during the transaction and exchange between the customers and enterprise. Campbell (2003) defines customer knowledge as: "organized and structured information about the customer as a result of systematic processing". According to Mitussis et al. (2006), customer knowledge is identified as one of the more complex types of knowledge, since customer knowledge can be captured from different sources and channels.

== Classification ==
Various classifications exist:

Gebert et al. (2002), classified customer knowledge from an organization's perspective into three types:

1. Knowledge about customers: Is gained mainly by service management, offer management, complaint management and, if available, contract management. The main user processes of knowledge regarding the customer are campaign management and service management, because both processes personalize their services based on user criteria. Knowledge about the customer must be transparent within the company; although its distribution beyond the border of the company must be controlled, as this type of knowledge can often be directly transformed into competitive advantages. The development of such knowledge is also expensive, because knowledge revelation is quite time-consuming.
2. Knowledge for customers: Is mainly developed in processes within the company, for example, the research and development section or a production department. Collecting this knowledge is the responsibility of campaign management. It should be refined according to the customer's requirements. It is then disseminated to the other customer relationship management (CRM) processes, mainly: contract management, offer management, and service management. CRM manages knowledge, transparency and dissemination of knowledge for customers. Maintaining the balance between comprehensibility and precision is the main challenge when managing this kind of knowledge.
3. Knowledge from customers: Can be obtained in the same ways as knowledge about customers. Capturing knowledge from customers is based on the important fact that customers who obtain their own expertise when utilizing a service or product can be seen as equal partners. This concept is not regularly understood in the business world and its effects have been poorly researched in academia (Garcia-Murillo and Annabi, 2002).

The same categorization of customer knowledge has been made by others such as Bueren et al. (2005) and Feng and Tian (2005).

In another categorization, Crié and Micheaux (2006) divide customer knowledge into two types, namely: "behavioural" (or quantitative) and "attitudinal" (or qualitative). Behavioral knowledge is easy to acquire and is basically quantitative by nature; that is, containing customer transactional relationship with the company. On the other hand, attitudinal knowledge is difficult to acquire because it deals with a customer's state of mind; but meanwhile it is an important factor for enhancement of customer knowledge because they are directly related to a customer's thoughts and insights.

=== Customer knowledge management ===
Customer knowledge management (CKM) concept emerges as a crucial element for customer-oriented value creation. CKM is important for collecting, collaborating, compositing and communicating customer knowledge.

== See also ==
- Consumer privacy
- Customer intelligence
- Customer relationship management
- Customer success
- Knowledge engineering
- Knowledge management
- Knowledge transfer

Journals:

- Electronic Journal of Knowledge Management
- Journal of Knowledge Management
- Journal of Knowledge Management Practice
