= Bainu (website) =

Chinese social networking site in Mongolian language

Bainu ("how are you?") is a Chinese social networking website written in the Mongolian language. As of 2020 it had about 400,000 users, concentrated in Inner Mongolia.

== Core features and positioning ==
Language and Cultural Characteristics

Bainu is based on Traditional Mongolian Script and supports social interactions in the Mongolian language, including various message formats such as text, voice, images, and video. This design aims to preserve and promote Mongolian language and culture, particularly appealing to users in Inner Mongolia and other Mongolian-populated areas.

Social Features

- Instant Messaging: Supports one-on-one private chats and group chats. Users can create interest-based groups or join local communities.
- Life Sharing: Through the "Chomorlig" feature (similar to Moments or a dynamic feed), users can share daily highlights to enhance community interaction.
- Location-Based Socializing: Recommends nearby users based on location, making it easier to connect with Mongolian friends in the same city or neighboring regions.

Multilingual Support

The app interface is available in English, Mongolian, and Simplified Chinese.

== Technical Features and User Experience ==
Cross-Platform Compatibility

Supports iPhone, iPad, Mac (with M1 chip or above), and Apple Vision Pro devices, covering users across the Apple ecosystem.

Pricing Model

Free download and basic features are available. Premium services (e.g., ad-free experience, extended social functions) require a subscription, with pricing options including $0.99/month, $2.99/quarter, and $6.99/year.

User Feedback

- Positive Reviews: Some users praise it as the "best Mongolian-language chat app," recognizing its cultural value and social convenience.
- Negative Feedback: Reports of app crashes and technical issues, with some users calling for improved stability (e.g., frequent crashes in the iOS version).

== Privacy and Data Policy ==
Bainu collects user data such as location, contact information, and device identifiers, which are linked to user identities. Additionally, user behavior may be tracked through third-party services, raising some privacy concerns.

== Current Development and Challenges ==
User Base

As of 2020, Bainu had approximately 400,000 users, primarily concentrated in Inner Mongolia.

Policy Impact

It was reported by Voice of America (VOA) that the Chinese authorities blocked Bainu on 23 August 2020 in order to prohibit Mongolians from discussing the issue of the authorities’ implementation of "bilingual education" in elementary schools.

But now, in 2025, this software is completely available for download and use.

see:https://bainu.com/
