= Vijay Pereira =

Indian scholar

Professor Vijay Pereira
- Scientific career
- Workplaces: University of Wollongong (Dubai campus); University of the South Pacific; University of Portsmouth

Vijay Pereira is a scholar and consultant.

== Career ==
Pereira is the Editor in Chief of the journal International Studies of Management and Organizations. He served as an Associate Editor (Strategic Management and Organizational Behavior) for the Journal of Business Research, and serves as the Global Real Impact Editor for the Journal of Knowledge Management.

Pereira was appointed President of the Indian Academy of Management in 2026.

Pereira is one of the active scholars publishing papers in business and management globally for the year’s 2021-22 and the highest ranked publishing scholar in Europe for the same period (P-rank).

== Books authored ==
- Pereira, V., and Malik, A. (2015). Human capital in the Indian IT / BPO industry. Palgrave Macmillan, London. Springer. ISBN 978-1-137-48152-8
- Pereira, V., and Malik, A. (2015). Investigating cultural aspects in Indian organizations: Empirical Evidence. In: India Studies in Business and Economics, New York. Springer. Springer. ISBN 978-3-319-16098-6
- Malik, A., and Pereira, V. (2016). Indian culture and work organisations in transition, Routledge (Taylor and Francis), London. Routledge. ISBN 9781315625447
- Lasrado, F., and Pereira, V. (2017). Achieving Sustainable Business Excellence: The Role of Human Capital, In: Palgrave Macmillan, London. Springer. ISBN 978-3-319-73314-2
- Sikdar, A., and Pereira, V. (2018). Business and Management Practices in South Asia: A Collection of Case Studies. Palgrave Macmillan, UAE. Springer. ISBN 9789811313998
- Chahal, H., Pereira, V., and Gupta Jeevan Jyoti. (2020). Sustainable Business Practices for Rural Development: The Role of Intellectual Capital. Palgrave Macmillan, London. Springer ISBN 978-981-13-9298-6
- Pereira, V., Neal, M., Temouri, Y., and Qureshi, W. (2020). Human Capital in the Middle East: A UAE Perspective. Palgrave Macmillan, London.Springer. ISBN 978-3-030-42211-0
- Pereira, V., Temouri, Y., and Vaz, D. (2022). Managing Sustainable Business Relationships in a Post Covid-19 Era: Towards a Dodecahedron Shaped Stakeholder Model. Springer Briefs in Business, Springer, New York.
- Budhwar, P and Pereira, V. (2023, forthcoming). ‘Doing Business in the Middle East’. Routledge, London, UK.Routledge. ISBN 9780367437855
