= Knowledge community =

A knowledge community is a community construct, stemming from the convergence of knowledge management as a field of study and social exchange theory. Formerly known as a discourse community and having evolved from forums and web forums, knowledge communities are now often referred to as a community of practice or virtual community of practice. As with any field of study, there are various points of view on the motivations, organizing principles and subsequent structure of knowledge communities.

== Perspectives ==
As a web or virtual construct, knowledge communities can be said to have evolved from bulletin board systems, web forums and online discourse communities through the 80s and 90s. When framed with the scores of social networking sites coming online at the turn of the millennia, knowledge communities can be described as another form of social media. The biggest difference between social network sites and knowledge communities is, social network sites typically lack moderation or an outcome orientation. Social knowledge management technologies such as Elium are emerging and aim at reconciling these differences.

Stemming from social exchange theory, a well-established perspective is to view knowledge communities as a type of exchange. The motivations for participating in the exchange vary. The exchange remains open based on the perceived value (e.g., return on time investment) to knowledge community members.

Knowledge communities can also be viewed as a method by which to do organizational or process innovation. KCs are often founded to introduce change to a system, an organizational or societal by identifying, creating, representing and/or distributing data, information and/or knowledge in and via a community context on the pretext that more significant value will be created via a knowledge value chain.

From an organizational perspective, knowledge communities serve to maintain the strong ties and weak ties of the organization with many diverse publics; they help feed quality back into the organization (via more timely feedback and narrative analysis of discussions), drive organization credibility (via more rich exposure and building public trust by incorporating diverse opinion) and speed knowledge transfer and knowledge utilization, as well as do knowledge mobilization (e.g., by providing a conversation space to bridge gaps between research and practice).

Common across perspectives is, knowledge communities can be employed to identify, create, represent, and/or distribute knowledge within and/or between populations.

== Organizational behavior and structure ==
Knowledge communities nurture and facilitate ongoing relationships and a Knowledge Ecosystem where ideas are exchanged on an ongoing basis. Knowledge value is generated (derived, realized) during the transactional nature of the exchange. Existing knowledge can be synthesized (e.g. research fused with ideas from the field or other research) or new knowledge created via exchanges. KCs use a variety of two-way communication tools (e.g., via discussion board, article commenting, rating, poll, webinar ) to foster discussion and the exchange of ideas.

The organizational structure of knowledge communities varies significantly based on sponsorship and purpose. Contribution, moderation and content governance within knowledge communities is typically distributed amongst a core set of community members who become community moderator\facilitators. At a minimum, members of knowledge communities typically include a mix of subject-matter experts, moderators, facilitators and the general public or a target population.

While information within a knowledge community is usually promoted to be open and public, persons are able to keep information private as well. Public information within knowledge communities is sometimes covered by Creative Commons Licenses and is given credit to the creators. Knowledge communities are seen as a bridge between traditional publishing models and an open access systems.

== Pitfalls ==
Knowledge communities and communities or practice suffer from the same pitfalls of all communities. To some, the mission driven orientation can be a detractor to creativity. To others, the exchange aspects reek of the over commodification of culture and, by pooling experts or like-minded persons, KCs and CoPs can often be less diverse than traditional communities. Perhaps the societal response has been the emergence of social networks. Again, however, it is important to point out social networks and knowledge communities are related, but not the same.

== See also ==
- Collaboration
- Community of practice (CoP)
- Innovation
- Knowledge building communities (KBC)
- Knowledge value chain
- Knowledge ecosystem
- Knowledge mobilization
- Learning community
- Learning organization
- Professional learning community (PLC)
- RIBA Knowledge Communities
- Virtual community of practice (VCoP)
- Virtual team
- Value network
- Value network analysis
- Virtual community (VC)
