= Mihaela Ulieru =

Romanian-Canadian computer scientist

Mihaela Ulieru is a Romanian-Canadian computer scientist and systems researcher whose work focuses on distributed intelligence, adaptive systems, artificial intelligence, and decentralized socio-technical systems, as well as the current president of the IMPACT Institute for the Digital Economy. Her research has examined the intersection of complex systems, digital governance, and emerging technologies, including blockchain and collective intelligence.

== Education ==
Ulieru received her early education in Romania before pursuing advanced studies in computer science and engineering. She earned a doctoral degree in computer science, with research centered on intelligent systems, distributed control, and adaptive architectures. Her academic training combined artificial intelligence, systems engineering, and complexity science.

== Career ==
Ulieru has held academic and research positions in North America and Europe, where she has contributed to interdisciplinary research on adaptive multi-agent systems, autonomic computing, and complex networks. Her work has addressed the design and governance of large-scale distributed systems in both technological and social contexts.

She has been involved in international research initiatives related to digital transformation, resilience, and decentralized coordination, collaborating with academic institutions, policy forums, and technology organizations. Ulieru has also participated in global discussions on the societal implications of artificial intelligence, data ecosystems, and decentralized infrastructure. She has contributed essays and commentary on technology and society, exploring themes such as collective intelligence, digital trust, and the future of governance in networked systems.

== Leadership ==
After this her doctoral research, she accepted a tenure-track position at Brunel University, London, UK in 1995. She was elected Senior Member of the Society of Manufacturing Engineers in 1999. She was elected Leader of the Canadian team on the PABADIS from 2001 through 2004. She was appointed the Academic Technical Advisor on the Berkeley Initative in Soft Computing in 2001 and still holds that position. She was appointed General Chair for 1st IEEE International Conference on Industrial Informatics by INDIN in 2003. She was also appointed Chair of Industrial Agents Sub-Committee by IEEE-IES in 2003.

== Research and Writing Awards ==
- International Research Award from the German Academic Exchange Foundation (1991-1993)
- Special Award Grant, Women in Science and Engineering, for doctoral research from the Ministry of Science and Culture of Land Hessen, Germany.
- Editor's Choice Award for Outstanding Achievement in Poetry in 1998, 1999, 2000, and 2001 by the National Library of Poetry. International Poet of Merit Award from the International Society of Poets in 2000.
- Distinugished Visting Professorship Award from Institute for Computer Science, The Univeristy of Essen in 2002.
- Who is Who in Poetry nomination by International Society of Poets in 2005.
- Finalist in the Innovation Research Consest of the Association of Health Technologies Industry in 2005.

== Selected publications ==
- Ulieru, M. Adaptive and Autonomic Systems: Foundations and Applications.
- Ulieru, M. Contributions to Scientific American on artificial intelligence and complex systems.
- Ulieru, M. Essays and reviews on blockchain, decentralization, and collective intelligence in technology publications.
