= Knowledge Index =

Knowledge Index may refer to:

- Dialog (online database)
- KEI or Knowledge Economic Index
