= Encapsulated knowledge =

Encapsulated knowledge is the value endowing meta-resource originating from thought, reflection, or experience that is embedded in an artefact’s design and functionality.

== Properties ==
Encapsulated knowledge may be considered that knowledge, which is found in a complex physical form, concealed from the casual observer, but physically transferable and acquirable in a marketplace, and provides utility to those who have the tacit knowledge necessary to use it. It is a recent addition to the knowledge-based view of the firm.

Encapsulated knowledge differs from both tacit knowledge and explicit knowledge. Encapsulated knowledge is not tacit because it resides outside of the human mind. It may also be distinguished from tacit knowledge in that it is a consequence of the application of tacit knowledge upon physical or material objects.

It is also useful to distinguish encapsulated knowledge from explicit knowledge. Encapsulated knowledge is not precisely explicit, even though this term has generally been juxtaposed with tacit knowledge, because it is knowledge concealed from its users, and explicitness implies observability. Encapsulated knowledge is distinguishable from codified knowledge primarily along the dimension of observability which has implications for the appropriability of value. The observability of explicit, codified knowledge makes it susceptible to misappropriation. Encapsulated knowledge, on the other hand, facilitates the marketing of knowledge since it can only be partially misappropriated through expensive reverse engineering.

Finally, both codification and encapsulation are motivated by a desire to inexpensively transfer knowledge. While codification is a process that reduces complexity, encapsulation preserves complexity. The value of encapsulation lies in the avoidance of the cost of learning to make use of the encapsulated knowledge. For example, utility can be realized from the use of knowledge encapsulated in a computer or an automobile apart from having to learn why they work. The vast majority of transactions that occur in consumer markets involve the purchase of some form of encapsulated knowledge.

== See also ==
- Knowledge management
