= RIBA Knowledge Communities =

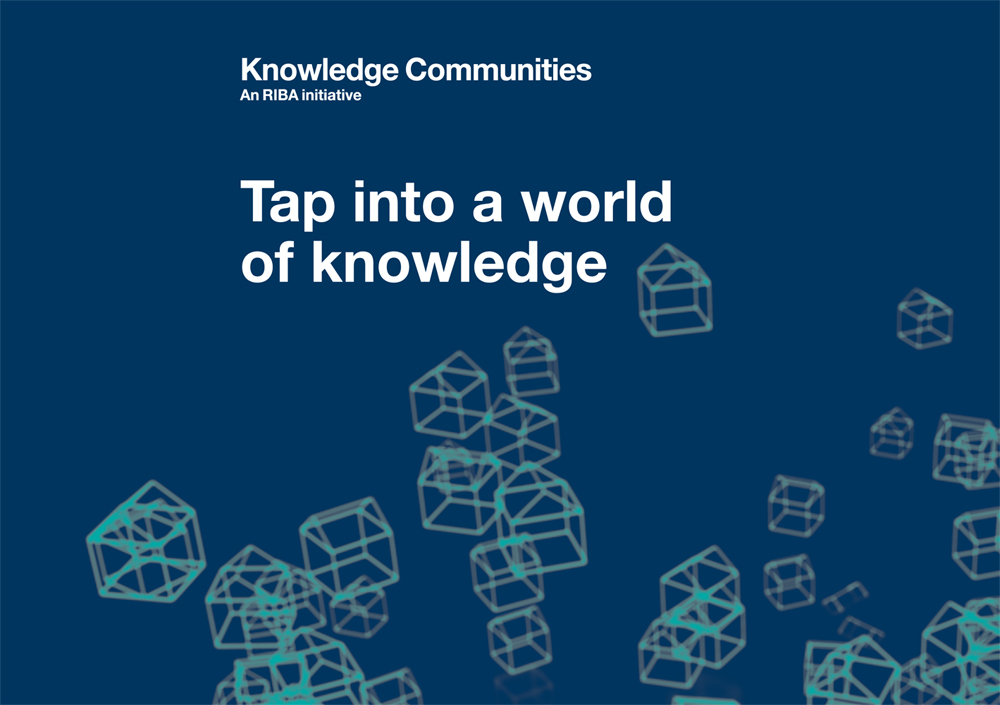
RIBA Knowledge Communities.

The RIBA Knowledge Communities are web-supported interdisciplinary groups designed to facilitate the capture, sharing, and application of professional knowledge related to architecture and the built environment. This initiative offers a knowledge community platform developed by RIBA. It is a collaborative resource, accessible to all professionals in the built environment field and those with related knowledge to contribute. Its main objective is to connect and engage professionals in the advancement of specific subjects of interest without any commercial intent.

== Communities ==
There are currently RIBA Knowledge Communities for the following subject areas:

Sustainability
For building environment professionals to discuss the sustainable production of architecture and to engage with the RIBA Sustainable Futures Group.
Integrated Project Working
To engage an interdisciplinary professional base in the advancement of CAD, BIM and the mutual distribution of technical information between all areas of the building environment.
Education Building Design
Helping to deliver intelligent higher education and further education school design and providing a forum for this discussion. It will leverage the level engagement among professionals in the industry. It will lead to enhanced outputs.
Students of Architecture
For architecture students to share news, experience and events while keeping in touch with architectural research and progression.
Regulations and Standards
To involve members in the production of building regulations and standards and to support the ongoing work of the joint BRE CIAT RIBA Technical Task Force.
Traditional Architecture
The RIBA Traditional Architecture group’s space to disseminate their research and to capture the experience of their members.
International
For the RIBA’s International department to build a knowledge bank from around the world.
Small Practice
Providing a platform for architects in small practice to share their experience while having the opportunity to be a part of the consultations for the RIBA Small Practice Group papers.
Development and Disaster Relief
To explore the difference that innovative design and construction can make in the lives of some of the most vulnerable people on earth (facilitated by Article 25).
Urban Greening
To create the pre-conditions necessary for trees to be considered as an integral part of development at the earliest conceptual and design stages of any scheme (facilitated by the Trees and Design Action Group).

== Structure ==
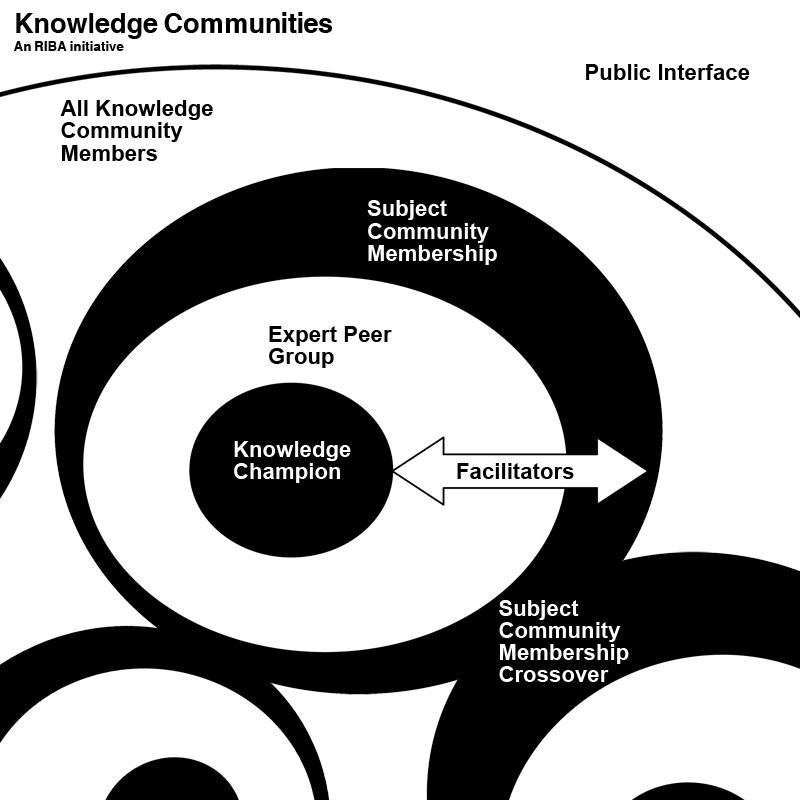
A diagram showing the structure of an RIBA Knowledge Community.

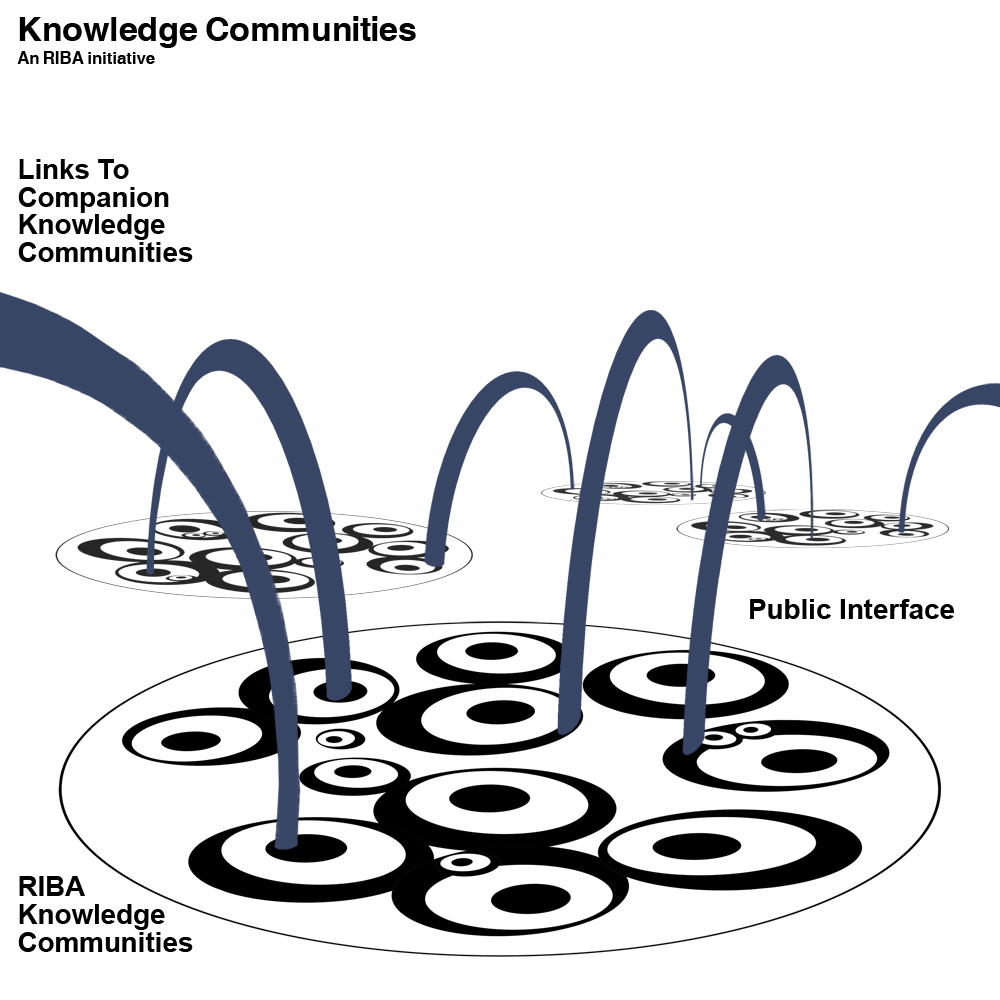
A diagram showing the overall structure of the RIBA Knowledge Communities with links to companion knowledge communities.

The RIBA Knowledge Communities website is a knowledge management initiative focused on architecture, which is supported by the RIBA Research & Development department. The communities are organized around existing RIBA committees and are responsible for devising and implementing plans to advance their respective areas of expertise pertaining to the built environment.

Champion
An appointed RIBA Knowledge Champion acts as a focal point for the governance of their respective RIBA Knowledge Community. They are selected on the basis of their expertise and active involvement in the community’s field of knowledge.
Expert Peer Group/Committee
The Peer Group consists of approximately 5-8 individuals. They are selected for their expertise and active involvement in their community's field of knowledge. The group delegates responsibilities in liaison with the community Facilitators and community members for routine tasks and responsibilities as well as one-off activities.
Community Facilitators
Facilitators will support the creation and maintenance of the communities. They are the main administrative focus for the work of the community. They receive support from the RIBA Research & Development department and provide assistance to ‘Knowledge Champions’ and ‘Expert Peer Groups’.
Community Members
Knowledge Communities are organised as collections of architects and other professionals who are committed to collaborations within specialist areas of design, management and construction.

== Applications ==
The RIBA Knowledge Communities website provides applications designed to engage the members in their subjects of interest, these include:

- Personal blogs
- Community discussion forums
- Community events calendars
- Contacts
- Members directory
- Resources (uploading files to share with other community members)
- Tags
- RSS feeds

The RIBA Knowledge Communities is powered by Elgg (software) which is an open source networking platform. The applications are installed as plugins that can be downloaded from the Elgg community website or created by PHP developers.
