= The Information Animal =

2025 book by Alicia Wanless

The Information Animal: Humans, Technology and the Competition for Reality
- Author: Alicia Wanless
- Language: English
- Subject: Information ecosystem, technology, disinformation, history
- Genre: Non-fiction
- Publisher: Hurst Publishers
- Publication date: May 2025
- Publication place: United Kingdom
- Media type: Print (hardback), e-book
- Pages: 272
- ISBN: 978-1-80526-288-6

The Information Animal: Humans, Technology and the Competition for Reality is a 2025 non-fiction book by Canadian researcher Alicia Wanless. Published by Hurst Publishers in the United Kingdom and Oxford University Press in select regions, the book examines the historical and contemporary interplay between humans, technology, and information ecosystems.

== Background ==
The author, Alicia Wanless is a senior fellow at the Carnegie Endowment for International Peace, where she directs the Information Environment Project. She holds a PhD in War Studies from King's College London, focusing on ecology and strategic theory applied to information conflicts. Wanless's research explores how individuals and societies interact with information spaces, particularly in the context of information warfare and propaganda. Her work has been influenced by her experiences in policy consulting, international affairs and at various think tanks. The book builds on Wanless's prior scholarship, including publications on strategic communications and the need for systemic approaches to information challenges.

== Reception ==
Research professor Mark Knell reviewed the book for Forskningspolitikk, calling it "dense but rewarding—a book for scholars, policymakers, and curious readers who want to grasp how power, truth, and technology collide in the digital age." He said that "the book grips the reader because Wanless blends history with urgency." Knell emphasized that the book's claim that information ecosystems are brittle, contentious, and political is supported by the ecological metaphor and case studies from Finland, Ukraine, and Vietnam.

Andy Hedgecock, writing for the Morning Star, called it a "persuasive analysis of the relationship between people and their information environment" and commended its "sedulous scholarship and holistic approach to assessing the interaction of information, politics, society and psychology." He described the publication as "timely," particularly in the context of global polycrises. However, Hedgecock critiqued Wanless's "tendency towards longwindedness," stating that "early chapters establishing the concept of information and justifying her use of the information environment framework are unnecessarily prolix" and that the book "deserves to be more accessible." Pre-publication endorsements from experts like Mariano-Florentino Cuéllar, Claire Wardle, Herbert Lin, and Benjamin Wittes were also positive, with Wardle calling it "fresh, original and absorbing" and Wittes labeling it a "foundational text for anyone wanting to understand the informational spaces in which we live."
