= International rankings of Belarus =

The following is a list of international rankings of Belarus.

== Communications ==
- Mobile Telephony Market Penetration (Pyramid Research, OECD, national regulatory agencies): in 2010, ranked 8 among the East Europe top 10 countries

== Demographics ==
- Population ranked 89 out of 239 countries and territories
- CIA World Factbook 2008 estimates Life expectancy ranked 138 out of 222 countries
- Population Density: in 2010 ranked 111 out of 235 countries

== Economy ==
Name	Year	Place	Out of
International Monetary Fund–GDP (nominal)	2011	71	183
International Monetary Fund–GDP (PPP)	2011	59	183
International Monetary Fund–GDP (PPP) per capita	2011	62	183
World Bank–GDP (PPP) per employed	2011	57	183
World Bank–Gini index	2011	9	183
The Heritage Foundation–Index of Economic Freedom	2012	153	179
Hausmann, Hidalgo–Economic complexity Index	2012	21	128
Kearney–KOF Globalization Index	2012	105	208
World Bank–Doing Business Index	2013	58	185

== Geography ==
- Total area ranked 86 out of 249 countries

== Globalization ==
- KOF: Index of Globalization 2012, ranked 105 out of 208 countries

== Health ==
- The World Health Organization's ranking of the world's health systems: 2000, ranked 72 out of 190 countries
- Legatum Institute Legatum Prosperity Index's ranking of the world's health systems: 2012, ranked 40 out of 142 countries.

== Industry ==
- OICA automobile production 2008, ranked 29 out of the top 51 countries

== Society ==
- The Economist: Quality-of-Life Index 2005 (2012), ranked 100 (54) out of 111 (142) countries
- United Nations: Human Development Index 2011, ranked 65 out of 187 countries
- NEF: Happy Planet Index 2012, ranked 104 out of 143 countries

== Tourism ==
- World Tourism Organization: World Tourism rankings 2012, not ranked among top 16 European countries

== Transportation ==
- Total rapid transit systems ranked 46 out of 52

== Education and Innovation ==
Organization	Survey	Last year	Ranking	First year	Ranking
United Nations Development Programme	Human Development Index; Education Index	New 2013 estimates for 2012; 2011	50 out of 186; 64 out of 187	2005	64 out of 177
World Bank	Knowledge Economy Index (KEI); Knowledge Index	2012	59 out of 145; 45 out of 145	2000	70 out of 145; 50 out of 145
World Intellectual Property Organization	Global Innovation Index	2026	88 out of 139	2011	not included
International Mathematical Olympiad	IMO Index; Gold Medals won Silver Medals won Bronze Medals won	2012	31 out of 145; 12; 44; 47		
Ranking Web of Universities	Webometrics Ranking of World Universities (Belarusian State University)	2012	596 out of 11998	2009	1916 out of 12000
SCImago Lab	SCimago institution Index (Science) (BSU); SIR Index (Science) (BSUIR)	2012	1504 out of 3290; 2916 out of 3290	2009	1614 out of 2124

== Political ==
- Transparency International: Corruption Perceptions Index, ranked 66 out of 163 countries
- Reporters without borders: Worldwide press freedom index, ranked 153 out of 167 countries
- The Economist Democracy Index 2007, ranked 150 out of 167 countries

== See also ==
- Lists of countries
- Lists by country
- List of international rankings
- Belarusian State University
- Republic of Belarus
