= Informatization =

Informatization or informatisation refers to the extent by which a geographical area, an economy or a society is becoming information-based, i.e. the increase in size of its information labor force. Usage of the term was inspired by Marc Porat’s categories of ages of human civilization: the Agricultural Age, the Industrial Age and the Information Age (1978). Informatization is to the Information Age what industrialization was to the Industrial Age. It has been stated that:

The Agricultural Age has brought about the agriculturization of the planet. The Industrial Age has caused among other things the industrialization of agriculture. The Information Age has resulted to the informatization of the agricultural industry (Flor, 1993).

The term has mostly been used within the context of national development. Everett Rogers defines informatization as the process through which new communication technologies are used as a means for furthering development as a nation becomes more and more an information society. However, some observers, such as Alexander Flor (1986) have cautioned about the negative impact of informatization on traditional societies.

Recently, the technological determinism dimension has been highlighted in informatization. Randy Kluver of Texas A&M University defines informatization as the process primarily by which information technologies, such as the World Wide Web and other communication technologies, have transformed economic and social relations to such an extent that cultural and economic barriers are minimized. Kluver expands the concept to encompass the civic and cultural arenas. He believes that it is a process whereby information and communication technologies shape cultural and civic discourse.

G. Wang describes the same phenomenon (1994) which she calls "informatization" as a "process" of change that features (a) the use of informatization and IT (information technologies) to such an extent that they become the dominant forces in commanding economic, political, social and cultural development; and (b) unprecedented growth in the speed, quantity, and popularity of information production and distribution."

== Origin of the term ==
The term informatisation was coined by Simon Nora and Alain Minc in their publication L'Informatisation de la société: Rapport à M. le Président de la République which was translated in English in 1980 as The Computerization of Society: A report to the President of France. (SAOUG) However, in an article published in 1987 Minc preferred to use informatisation and not computerization.

After the 1978 publication the concept was adopted in French, German and English subject literatures and was broadened to include more aspects than only computers and telecommunications (SAOUG).

== Social impact ==
Informatization has many far-reaching consequences in society. Kim (2004) observes that these include repercussions in economics, politics and other aspects of modern living. In the economic sphere, for example, information is viewed as a focal resource for development, replacing the centrality of labor and capital during the industrial age. In the political arena, there are increased opportunities for participative democracy with the advent of information and communication technology (ICT) that provide easy access to information on varied social and political issues.

== In economic systems ==
Industrialization propelled transformation of the economic system from agricultural age to modernized economies, and so informatization ushered the industrial age into an information-rich economy. Unlike the agricultural and industrial ages where economics refers to optimization of scarce resources, the information age deals with maximization of abundant resources. Alexander Flor (2008) wrote that informatization gives rise to information-based economies and societies wherein information naturally becomes a dominant commodity or resource. The accumulation and efficient use of knowledge has played a central role in the transformation of the economy (Linden 2004).

== Globalization ==
Over the years, globalization and informatization have "redefined industries, politics, cultures, and perhaps the underlying rules of social order" (Friedman 1999). Although they explain different phenomena, their social, political, economic, and cultural functions remarkably overlaps. "Although globalization ultimately refers to the integration of economic institutions, much of this integration occurs through the channels of technology. Although international trade is not a new phenomenon, the advent of communications technologies has accelerated the pace and scope of trade" (Kluver).

a) Globalization and Informatization will have great impact on cultural and social consequences of society.

b) "Globalization and informatization are likely to diminish the concept of the national as a political institution" (Poster 1999). Friedman (1999) argues that as nation states decline in importance, multi-national corporations, nongovernmental organizations, and "superempowered individuals" such as George Soros gain influence and importance. As these non-political organizations and institutions gain importance, there are inevitable challenges to political, economic, and cultural processes.

c) On the other hand, globalization and informatization allow for efficient flow of information. Individuals and societies are, therefore, greatly empowered to engage in international arena for economic, political, and cultural resources.

d) "There is proliferation of information about lifestyles, religions, and cultural issues. The telecommunications and computer networks also allow for unprecedented global activism. This democratization of information increases the potential for international harmony, although it by no means guarantees it" (Kluver).

e) These twin forces greatly affects "centuries of tradition, local autonomy, and cultural integrity."

f) "Finally, one of the potentially most devastating impact of the forces of globalization and informatization is that there is created an insidious conflict between the new global economic order and the local, or even tribal, interests" (Kluver).

== Measurement ==
Kim (2004) proposed to measure the informatization in a country using a composite measure made up of the following extraneous variables: Education, R&D Expenditure, Agricultural Sector and Intellectual Property. Kim also relates increasing democracy as evidence of social informatization. It supposedly take into consideration the three approaches to conceptualizing informatization namely the economic, technological, and stock. Each can be measured with economic data (e.g. GDP), ICT data (e.g. number of computers per population), and amount of information (e.g. number of published technological journals) respectively.

Such composite measure is similar to the World Bank's Knowledge Assessment Methodology (KAM) Variables (2008) which are clustered into: overall performance of the economy, economic incentive and institutional regime, innovation system, education and human resources, and information and communication technology.

=== Difficulties with measurement ===
The measurement for the level of informatization is an ongoing area of development. Among the issues are the ambiguity of the definition of "information" and whether this entity can be quantifiable in contrast to the tangible products of industrialization.

Taylor and Zang (2007) explored the issues behind the limitations of current theoretical models in terms of quantifying the positive impacts of ICT projects, and provided critiques of the information indicators used to gauge and justify informatization projects.

International organizations such as the United Nations, through its World Summit on the Information Society (WSIS) and International Telecommunication Union (ITU); and Organisation for Economic Co-operation and Development (OECD) also recognize this challenge and have initiated efforts to improve the methodologies for measuring an "information society".

== National laws ==
Informatization is recognized by states as important to national development. Some states have created laws implementing or regulating informatization.

In Russia the State Duma enacted the Federal Law on Information, Informatization, and the Protection of Information on January 25, 1995. It was signed into law by President Boris Yeltsin on February 20, 1995.

Azerbaijan had a Law on Information, Informatization and Protection of Information in 1998.

== Through TV white space (TVWS) technology ==
TV white space refers to the unused TV channels between the active ones in the VHF and UHF spectrum. TV spectrum is commonly referred to as television "white spaces". TV white space can be used to provide broadband internet access, particularly in remote and rural areas (Edwards, 2016), and as such can serve as a tool for increasing information access and social and economic development. In 2008 The Federal Communications Commission voted to reallocate unlicensed white space spectrum for public use (White Space, n.d.)

== See also ==
- Digital divide
- Information Age
- Information revolution
- Information society
- Knowledge economy
