= Knowledge balance sheet =

A knowledge balance sheet is a management and reporting instrument used to identify and describe an organisation’s intellectual capital. It seeks to improve transparency regarding intangible assets by illustrating their relationship with organisational objectives, business processes, and business performance.

Unlike traditional financial statements, which focus primarily on tangible and financial assets, a knowledge balance sheet aims to make visible the role of human, structural, and relational capital in value creation. It is commonly applied as a support tool for knowledge management and strategic decision-making rather than as a substitute for financial reporting.

== History ==
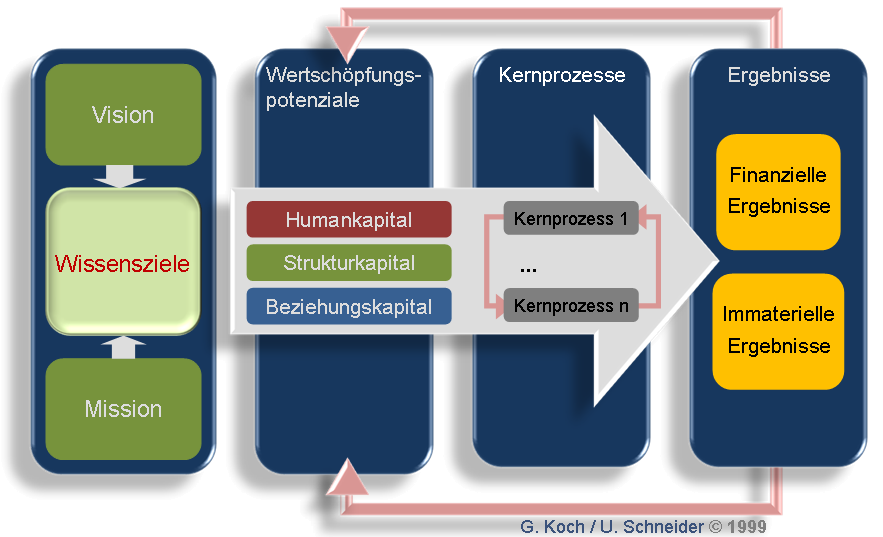
Wissensbilanz version 1.0

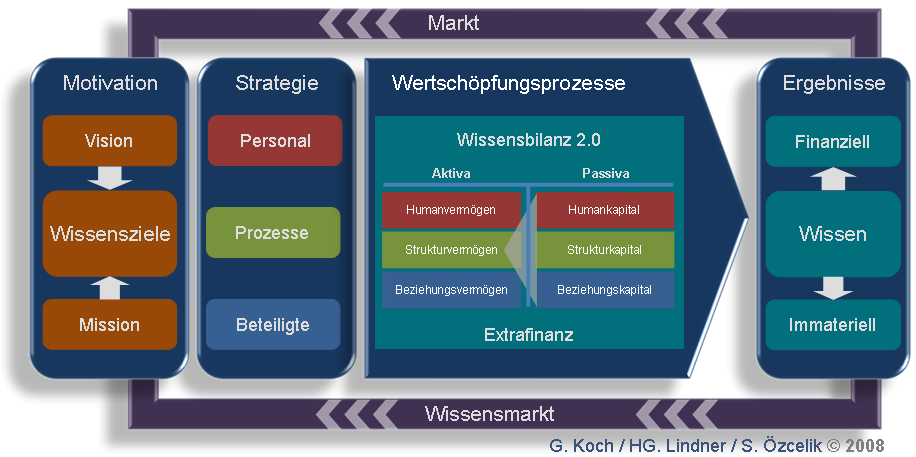
Wissensbilanz version 2.0

The concept of the knowledge balance sheet emerged in the late 1990s alongside growing academic and practitioner interest in intellectual capital and other intangible value drivers. Researchers argued that conventional accounting frameworks did not adequately reflect the increasing importance of knowledge, skills, organisational processes, and external relationships in knowledge-based economies.

The intellectual foundations of the knowledge balance sheet are closely linked to earlier work on intellectual capital developed in Scandinavia and continental Europe, including models such as intellectual capital statements and scorecard-based approaches. These approaches sought to complement financial reporting by systematically describing non-financial resources.

In the early 2000s, the knowledge balance sheet gained particular prominence in German-speaking countries, especially Germany and Austria. In Austria, the Wissensbilanz became mandatory for public universities under the Universities Act 2002, establishing one of the most formalised applications of the concept. In Germany, publicly supported pilot projects encouraged small and medium-sized enterprises to use knowledge balance sheets for internal management and external communication.

== Perspectives and use ==
From an external perspective, a knowledge balance sheet may serve as a supplementary reporting instrument intended to inform stakeholders about an organisation’s intangible assets and long-term development capacity.

Internally, it is more commonly used as a management tool to support the assessment and development of intellectual capital and to encourage reflection on how knowledge resources align with organisational strategy.

== Benefits and limitations ==
Proponents argue that knowledge balance sheets can help identify organisational strengths and weaknesses, improve transparency, and support communication with stakeholders. The process of identifying intellectual capital may also contribute to organisational learning and process improvement.

However, the approach has been criticised for lacking a universally accepted standard, limiting comparability between organisations. Knowledge balance sheets are typically not subject to external audit verification, and empirical links between reported intellectual capital and future financial performance are difficult to establish. Critics also note the risk that such instruments may be used primarily for image management rather than substantive decision-making.

== See also ==
- Intellectual capital
- Information management
- Balance sheet
- Knowledge intensive services
