= Threshold knowledge =

Threshold knowledge is a term in the study of higher education used to describe core concepts—or threshold concepts—which, once understood, transform perception of a given subject, phenomenon, or experience.

The term was introduced by Jan Meyer and Ray Land, Meyer and Land also discuss the related idea of troublesome knowledge, ideas that appear alien or counter-intuitive. The theory holds that:

... there are certain concepts, or certain learning experiences, which resemble passing through a portal, from which a new perspective opens up, allowing things formerly not perceived to come into view. This permits a new and previously inaccessible way of thinking about something. It represents a transformed way of understanding, or interpreting, or viewing something, without which the learner cannot progress, and results in a reformulation of the learners' frame of meaning. The thresholds approach also emphasises the importance of disciplinary contexts. As a consequence of comprehending a threshold concept there may thus be a transformed internal view of subject matter, subject landscape, or even world view. Typical examples might be 'Personhood' in Philosophy; 'The Testable Hypothesis' in Biology; 'Gravity' in Physics; 'Reactive Power' in Electrical Engineering; 'Depreciation' in Accounting; 'Legal Narrative' in Law; 'Geologic Time' in Geology; 'Uncertainty' in Environmental Science; 'Deconstruction' in Literature; 'Limit' in Mathematics or 'Object-oriented Programming' in Computer Science.

These ideas have been explored by several subsequent researchers in a variety of disciplinary contexts including:

- International theory
- Science education
- Economics
- Healthcare education
- Miscellaneous
- Statistics
- Information literacy
- Writing studies

The theory has also been criticised.

The notion of threshold concept is related to the notion of bottleneck in the Decoding the Disciplines framework. It can be considered a special case of the latter.

== See also ==
- Eureka effect
- Decoding the Disciplines
- Paradigm shift
- Tacit knowledge
- Propaedeutics
