= Journal of Information & Knowledge Management =

- Discipline: Knowledge management
- Language: English
- Edited by: Suliman Hawamdeh

Publication details
- History: 2002-present
- Publisher: World Scientific (Singapore)
- Frequency: Quarterly

Standard abbreviations
- ISO 4: J. Inf. Knowl. Manag.

Indexing
- ISSN: 0219-6492 (print); 1793-6926 (web)

Links
- Journal homepage

The Journal of Information & Knowledge Management was founded in 2002 and is a peer-reviewed academic journal published quarterly by World Scientific. It publishes articles covering information processing and knowledge management, including: tools, techniques and technologies; knowledge creation and sharing; as well as best practices, policies and guidelines.

== Abstracting and indexing ==
The journal is abstracted and indexed in:

- io-port.net
- Inspec

== Editorial Board ==
Title	Editor	Affiliation
Editor-in-Chief	Suliman Hawamdeh	University of North Texas
Regional Editor: North America	Michael Koenig	Long Island University
Regional Editor: Europe	Franz Barachini	BIC-AUSTRIA
Regional Editor: Asia	Samuel Kai Wah Chu	The University of Hong Kong
Regional Editor: Australia and New Zealand	Frada Burstein	Monash University
