= Information space =

Set of concepts and relations among them, held by an information system

Information space is the set of concepts, and relations among them, held by an information system; it describes the range of possible values or meanings an entity can have under the given rules and circumstances.

== Scholarly definitions ==
An information space is a type of information design in which representations of information objects are situated in a principled space. In a principled space location and direction have meaning, so that mapping and navigation become possible.

— MIT Artificial Intelligence Laboratory

Information spaces surround us. When we retrieve a file from our computer, we are browsing through an information space; when we use a search engine we are sifting through an information space; and when we visit a website we are moving through yet another information space.

— Jason Withrow

Another definition, which is a bit more idealistic, is that an Information Space is the total result of the semantic activity of the humanity, "the world of names and titles", conjugated to the ontological world. Being a primary concept, the information space cannot be precisely defined and is set as a dialectical opposition to the material, physical, object space.

Author Max H. Boisot, wrote a book on Information Space: A framework for learning in organizations, institutions and culture. In his book, Boisot (1995, p. 5) describes information space as a conceptual framework or tool for studying how knowledge and information are codified, abstracted and diffused through a social system.

== See also ==
- Cognitive space
- Information ecosystem
- Semantics
