= Apple ecosystem =

Apple's digital product ecosystem

The Apple ecosystem is a term used to describe Apple's digital ecosystem of products and services, including the iPhone, iPad, Apple Watch, Mac computers, HomePod, Apple TV, and the applications that run on them. It is often praised for its seamless integration and optimization between various networks of devices, software and services, largely emphasized by Apple's focus on privacy, but criticized for its closed system and lack of customer control.

Apple products often have additional features when used together, as opposed to devices from other companies. Privacy is also considered a major perk of the ecosystem, as Apple markets its products with high standards of privacy, sometimes using it as a selling point over competitors.

== "Walled garden" ==
Apple's ecosystem is often described as a "walled garden". While peripherals such as AirPods, HomePods and AirTags integrate complementarily into the ecosystem, with products such as the iPhone, it does not function as well or with as many features with competitive devices such as Android smartphones. Additionally, it is hard to switch from the ecosystem once users have immersed themselves into it, as it is designed to keep users from leaving.

== Advanced Data Protection ==
Advanced Data Protection (ADP) is an Apple ecosystem setting that was launched in December 2022, rolling out globally in January 2023 with the iOS 16.2 update. It uses end-to-end encryption to ensure that the iCloud data types — messages, photos, notes, voice memos, wallet passes, and more — can only be decrypted on devices authorized by the user. Data remains encrypted without ADP enabled, preventing exploits and leaks like the 2014 celebrity nude photo leak from occurring.

With this enabled, the amount of data that is encrypted increases, which begins to cover iCloud Backup, Notes and Photos. Some major data categories remain omitted, including iCloud Mail, Contacts and Calendar" Once the ADP setting is turned on, Apple will not have the keys to uncover the user's data. This means that the user will have to use a third-party security method if the user loses access to their iCloud account. When ADP is turned on, Apple suggests a contact of the iCloud account owner to be the "recovery contact."

=== In the United Kingdom ===
On February 7, 2025, The Washington Post reported that in January 2025, "the office of the Home Secretary has served Apple with a document called a technical capability notice, ordering it to provide access under the sweeping U.K. Investigatory Powers Act of 2016", that Apple create a "backdoor" to access data protected under ADP. On February 21, 2025, Advanced Data Protection was disabled for new users in the United Kingdom, with existing users' access to be disabled at a future date after a period of time has passed. This excludes other Apple services that already use end-to-end encryption, and data that is already encrypted by default remains protected.

== See also ==
- Epic Games v. Apple
