= Knowledge space (philosophy) =

Philosophical concept

In philosophy and media studies, a knowledge space is described as an emerging anthropological space in which the knowledge of individuals becomes the primary focus for social structure, values, and beliefs. The concept is put forward and explored by philosopher and media critic Pierre Lévy in his 1997 book Collective Intelligence.

== Anthropological Space ==
Levy's notion of the "knowledge space" relies on his conception of anthropological spaces, which he defines as "a system of proximity (space) unique to the world of humanity (anthropological), and thus dependent on human technologies, significations, language, culture, conventions, representations, and emotions" (5). Building on the language of the philosophers Gilles Deleuze and Félix Guattari, he states that "anthropological spaces in themselves are neither infrastructures nor superstructures but planes of existence, frequencies, velocities, determined within the social spectrum" (147). Each space contains "worlds of signification" (149) by which humans come to understand and make sense of the world. Furthermore, although one space may dominate, many spaces can and do exist simultaneously.

Levy describes three existing anthropological spaces. They are:

1. Earth - This space corresponds with hunter-gatherer eras in which people identify themselves by familial relationships, derive meaning via intimate connection with the signifier, and where conceptions of time are driven by reminiscence. Passed down narratives become the guiding instruments that exist within the body of the community.
2. Territorial - This space corresponds to the rise of civilizations and the insistent division of things and signs. Within this space history becomes closed and authoritative. Within territorial space people identify themselves by property ownership and nationality and look to religion for guidance, with the book become the substrate of choice.
3. Commodity - This space corresponds to the rise of industrial revolution and world-markets in which people begin to identify themselves through one's career and wealth. In this space, meaning becomes illusory, our sense of time becomes abstract and uniform (through the use of clocks) while our sense of space becomes configured into a network. Statistics and probability become guiding concepts and indexes and networks of information becomes the substrate through which knowledge is passed on. (175,210)

== The emerging knowledge space ==
The knowledge space is an emerging anthropological space which, while it has always existed (139), is only now coming into fruition as a guiding space of humanity. In this space, singularities (individuals) are recognized as singularities and knowledge becomes the guiding value for humanity. Since all human experience represents unique knowledge, within the knowledge space all individuals are valued for their unique knowledge regardless of race (earth space), nationality (territorial space), or economic status (commodity space). Within this space static identity gives way to the "quantum identities" as individuals become participates and the distinction between of "us" and "them" disappears (159). Instead, humanity forms "collective intelligences" in which knowledge is valued and freely traded. What is "real" becomes "that which implies the practical activity, intellectual and imaginary, of living subjects" (168). Life, experiences, and knowledge become the underlying and ever changing guiding path for human societies.

== Relation to Technology ==
Levy's theories rely heavily on the technological developments of the 1990s, particularly the rise of biotechnology, nanotechnology, the Internet, new media and information technologies. In chapter 3, he describes how technologies have made a shift from the molar to the molecular (a move which makes literal a distinction by Deleuze and Guattari) in that technologies now handle units as individuals (his term is "singularities") rather than in mass. He suggests that this mirrors our rising recognition of the individuals as singularities rather than massive conglomerated groups.
