= Information ecology =

Modeling information space as ecosystem

Information ecology is the application of ecological concepts for modeling the information society. It considers the dynamics and properties of the increasingly dense, complex and important digital informational environment. "Information ecology" often is used as metaphor, viewing the information space as an ecosystem, the information ecosystem.

Information ecology also makes a connection to the concept of collective intelligence and knowledge ecology. Eddy et al. (2014) use information ecology for science-policy integration in ecosystems-based management (EBM).

== Networked information economy ==
In The Wealth of Networks: How Social Production Transforms Markets and Freedom, a book published in 2006 and available under a Creative Commons license on its own wikispace, Yochai Benkler provides an analytic framework for the emergence of the networked information economy that draws deeply on the language and perspectives of information ecology together with observations and analyses of high-visibility examples of successful peer production processes, citing Wikipedia as a prime example.

Bonnie Nardi and Vicki O'Day in their book Information Ecologies: Using Technology with Heart apply the ecology metaphor to local environments, such as libraries and schools, in preference to the more common metaphors for technology as tool, text, or system.

== In different domains and disciplines ==
=== Anthropology ===
Nardi and O'Day's book represents the first specific treatment of information ecology by anthropologists. H. E. Kuchka (a collective pseudonym) situates information within socially-distributed cognition of cultural systems. Casagrande and Peters use information ecology for an anthropological critique of Southwest US water policy. Stepp (1999) published a prospectus for the anthropological study of information ecology.

=== Knowledge management ===
Information ecology was used as book title by Thomas H. Davenport and Laurence Prusak, with a focus on the organization dimensions of information ecology. There was also an academic research project at DSTC called Information ecology, concerned with distributed information systems and online communities.

=== Law ===
Law schools represent another area where the phrase is gaining increasing acceptance, e.g. NYU Law School Conference Towards a Free Information Ecology and a lecture series on Information ecology at Duke University Law School's Center for the Study of the Public Domain.

=== Library science ===
The field of library science has seen significant adoption of the term and librarians have been described by Nardi and O'Day as a "keystone species in information ecology", and references to information ecology range as far afield as the Collaborative Digital Reference Service of the Library of Congress, to children's library database administrator in Russia.

=== Science-policy integration (SPI) / Ecosystems-based management (EBM) ===
Eddy et al. (2014) use principles of information ecology to develop a framework for integrating scientific information in decision-making in ecosystem-based management (EBM). Using a metaphor of how a species adapts to environmental changes through information processing, they developed a 3-tiered model that differentiates primary, secondary and tertiary levels of information processing, within both the technical and human domains.

== See also ==
- Biosemiotics
- Collaborative filtering
- Collective intelligence
- Collective memory
- Complex adaptive system
- Crowd psychology
- Diffusion of innovations
- Digital ecosystem
- Environmental health
- Information ethics
- Information infrastructure
- Information pollution
- Information science
- Information society
- Knowledge commons
- Knowledge ecosystem
- Knowledge management
- Knowledge organization
- Knowledge tagging
- Media ecology
- Sociology of knowledge
