= Decoding the Disciplines =

Decoding the Disciplines is a process intended to increase student learning by narrowing the gap between expert and novice thinking. The process seeks to make explicit the tacit knowledge of experts and to help students master the mental actions they need for success in particular courses.

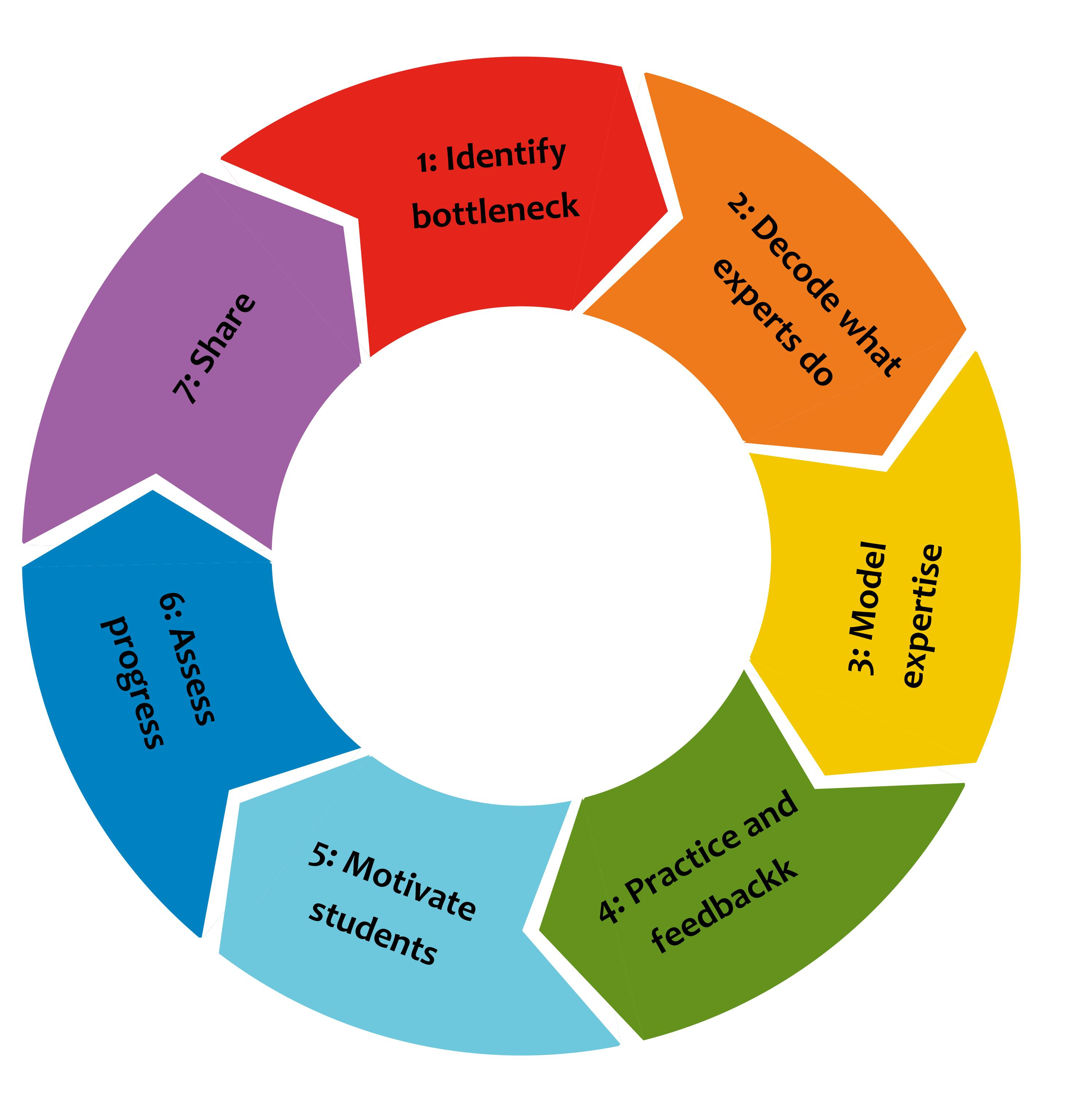
Graphical representation of the Decoding the Disciplines process

== History ==
The Decoding the Disciplines approach was initiated by Joan Middendorf and David Pace, directors of the Indiana University Freshman Learning Project from 1998 to 2010, for collegiate learning. They found a discrepancy between the content taught and the actual prerequisites for success in many courses. They attributed this to automatic, and thus untaught, processes in expert knowledge. They hypothesized that students were often provided with incomplete conceptual frameworks, leaving them unable to tackle significant challenges.

== Guiding questions in the Decoding process ==
The Decoding process is structured by seven questions, referred to as steps. The order of the steps is not mandatory and can be changed as needed.

Question 1 - Where do I experience a bottleneck to learning?
Instructors (Professors, Lecturers, etc.) identify an activity or task in their course that students are supposed to learn but often fail. The activity may be a mental activity.

Question 2 - What do students have to be able to do to get past the bottleneck?
Instructors explore the steps that disciplinary experts go through to accomplish the activity or task identified as a bottleneck. This exploration is often carried out via a Decoding interview.

Question 3 - How can I show students what they have to do?
Instructors may model how they accomplish these activities as an expert. In order to do so, instructors may
- perform the (mental) steps in front of your students using a subject-specific example.
- explicitly highlight critical operations.
- use metaphors or analogies for the (mental) steps.

Question 4 - How can I give my students practice and feedback?
Often instructors provide their students with tasks or learning activities that allow students to perform the activity identified as a bottleneck and receive feedback.

Question 5 - How can I deal with emotional bottlenecks to learning?
Resistance to the Decoding the Disciplines process is viewed as an emotional bottleneck. Instructors are encouraged to anticipate such resistances.

Question 6 - How can I know if my students have mastered these operations?
Instructors give assessments that provide information on the degree to which students can perform the activity identified as a bottleneck.

Question 7 - How can I share this process with others?
Instructors may share their findings informally with colleagues or more formally through publications or presentations. As of 2023 instructors and researchers have published more than 500 articles on Decoding.

== Applications ==
The framework been explored by several researchers in a variety of disciplinary contexts including:

- Astronomy
- Biology
- Economics
- Geology
- History
- Law
- Mathematics
- Music
- Psychology
