= Developer ecosystem =

A developer ecosystem is a set of software developers functioning as a unit and interacting with a shared market for software artefacts. Developer ecosystems are similar to software ecosystems.

Many software platform producers are currently attempting to create developer ecosystems, by mobilizing developers from other organizations to create extensions to those platforms. Examples of developer programs are the Microsoft Developer Network and the SAP Developer Network.
