= Social knowledge management =

Social knowledge management is a business approach that aims to leverage the collective intelligence and social interactions of an organization’s members and stakeholders. It is a branch of knowledge management, which is a multidisciplinary field that deals with the creation, sharing, and use of knowledge in various domains, such as business, economics, psychology, and information management. Knowledge management seeks to enhance organizational performance, innovation, and competitiveness by managing the intangible assets of an organization, such as human capital, know-how, technology, customers, and networks.

Social media plays a crucial role in social knowledge management by enhancing communication, collaboration, and learning among individuals and groups, both internally and externally. It offers valuable insights and feedback from customers, partners, and stakeholders, and aids in generating and disseminating new knowledge. In a business context, social media is utilized for various purposes, including sentiment analysis, social learning, social collaboration, and social knowledge management.

Social knowledge management is one of the application areas of social media in a business context next to others like sentiment analysis, social learning or social collaboration. Social media use by businesses can strive to achieve the following things from social media strategy point of view: learn, listen, engage in conversation, measure and refine, develop capabilities, define activities, prioritize objectives etc. Social media are not only transforming private communication and interaction, they also will transform how people work. With social media knowledge work in organizations can be optimized extremely: like a better distribution sharing and access to knowledge. This will be more and more important, as in today's business world, speed and complexity increase dramatically, while work environments change constantly.

== Examples of Social KM platforms ==
- Elium, a European software application which combines social tagging, bookmarking and networking paradigms to address internal information management purposes.
- Sciomino was a startup enterprise social network for Social Knowledge Management.
