= Tacit knowledge =

Skills, ideas and experiences

Tacit knowledge or implicit knowledge is knowledge that is difficult to extract or articulate—as opposed to conceptualized, formalized, codified, or explicit knowledge—and is therefore more difficult to convey to others through verbalization or writing. Examples of tacit knowledge include individual wisdom, experience, insight, motor skill, and intuition. An example of "explicit" information that can be recorded, conveyed, and understood by the recipient is the knowledge that London is in the United Kingdom. On the other hand, speaking a language, riding a bicycle, kneading dough, playing an instrument, or designing and operating sophisticated machinery, each require a variety of knowledge that is difficult or impossible to transfer readily to other people and is not always known "explicitly", even by skilled practitioners.

== Overview ==
=== Origin ===
The term tacit knowing is attributed to Michael Polanyi's Personal Knowledge (1958). In his later work, The Tacit Dimension (1966), Polanyi made the assertion that "we can know more than we can tell." He states not only that there is knowledge that cannot be adequately articulated by verbal means, but also that all knowledge is rooted in tacit knowledge. While this concept made most of its impact on philosophy of science, education and knowledge management—all fields involving humans—it was also, for Polanyi, a means to show humankind's evolutionary continuity with animals. Polanyi describes that many animals are creative, some even have mental representations, but can only possess tacit knowledge. This excludes humans, however, who developed the capability of articulation and therefore can transmit partially explicit knowledge. This relatively modest difference then turns into a big practical advantage, but there is no unexplained evolutionary gap.

=== Definition ===
Tacit knowledge can be defined as skills, ideas and experiences that are possessed by people but are not codified and may not necessarily be easily expressed. With tacit knowledge, people are not often aware of the knowledge they possess or how it can be valuable to others. Effective transfer of tacit knowledge generally requires extensive personal contact, regular interaction, and trust. This kind of knowledge can only be revealed through practice in a particular context and transmitted through social networks. To some extent it is "captured" when the knowledge holder joins a network or a community of practice.

Some examples of daily activities and tacit knowledge are: riding a bike, playing the piano, driving a car, hitting a nail with a hammer, putting together pieces of a complex jigsaw puzzle, and interpreting a complex statistical equation.

In the field of knowledge management, the concept of tacit knowledge refers to knowledge that cannot be fully codified. An individual can acquire tacit knowledge without language. Apprentices, for example, work with their mentors and learn craftsmanship not only through language but also by observation, imitation, and practice.

The key to acquiring tacit knowledge is experience. Without some form of shared experience, it is extremely difficult for people to share each other's thinking processes.

==== Terrain ====
Tacit knowledge can be divided according to the terrain. Terrains affect the process of changing tacit knowledge into explicit knowledge. Terrains are of three kinds:

- Relational tacit knowledge: Relational tacit knowledge could be made explicit, but not made explicit for reasons that touch on deep principles that have to do with either the nature or location of knowledge of the way humans are made. This knowledge refers to things we could describe in principle if someone put effort into describing them.
- Somatic tacit knowledge: Somatic tacit knowledge has to do with properties of individuals bodies and brains as physical things. It includes things our bodies can do but we cannot describe how, like riding a bike. In principle it is possible for it to be explicated as the outcome of research done by human scientists.
- Collective tacit knowledge: Collective tacit knowledge is a kind of knowledge that we do not know how to make explicit and that we cannot envisage how to explicate. It is the domain of knowledge that is located in society, such as the rules for language - it has to do with the way society is constituted.

==== Embodied knowledge ====
Tacit knowledge has been described as “know-how” as opposed to “know-what” (facts). This distinction between “know-how” and “know-what” is considered to date back to a 1945 paper by Gilbert Ryle given to the Aristotelian Society in London. In his paper, Ryle argues against the (intellectualist) position that all knowledge is knowledge of Propositions (“know-what”), and therefore the view that some knowledge can only be defined as “know-how”. Ryle's argument has, in some contexts, come to be called "anti-intellectualist". There are further distinctions such as "know-why" (science) or "know-who" (networking).

Tacit knowledge involves learning and skill but not in a way that can be written down. On this account, knowing-how or “embodied knowledge” is characteristic of the expert, who acts, makes judgments, and so forth without explicitly reflecting on the principles or rules involved. The expert works without having a theory of his or her work; he or she just performs skillfully without deliberation or focused attention. Embodied knowledge represents a learned capability of a human body's nervous and endocrine systems.

== Differences from explicit knowledge ==
Although it is possible to distinguish conceptually between explicit and tacit knowledge, they are not separate and discrete in practice. The interaction between these two modes of knowing is vital for the creation of new knowledge.

Tacit knowledge can be distinguished from explicit knowledge in three major areas:

- Codifiability and mechanism of transferring knowledge: Explicit knowledge can be codified (for example, 'can you write it down' or 'put it into words' or 'draw a picture'), and easily transferred without the knowing subject. In contrast, tacit knowledge is intuitive and unarticulated knowledge that cannot be communicated, understood or used without the 'knowing subject'. Unlike the transfer of explicit knowledge, the transfer of tacit knowledge requires close interaction and the buildup of shared understanding and trust among them.
- Main methods for the acquisition and accumulation: Explicit knowledge can be generated through logical deduction and acquired through practical experience in the relevant context. In contrast, tacit knowledge can only be acquired through practical experience in the relevant context.
- Potential of aggregation and modes of appropriation: Explicit knowledge can be aggregated at a single location, stored in objective forms, and appropriated without the participation of the knowing subject. Tacit knowledge, in contrast, is personal and contextual; it is distributed across knowing subjects, and cannot easily be aggregated. The realization of its full potential requires the close involvement and cooperation of the knowing subject.

The process of transforming tacit knowledge into explicit or specifiable knowledge is known as codification, articulation, or specification. The tacit aspects of knowledge are those that cannot be codified, but can only be transmitted via training or gained through personal experience. There is a view against the distinction, where it is believed that all propositional knowledge (knowledge that) is ultimately reducible to practical knowledge (knowledge how).

== Nonaka–Takeuchi model ==
Ikujiro Nonaka proposed a model of knowledge creation that explains how tacit knowledge can be converted to explicit knowledge, both of which can be converted into organisational knowledge. While introduced by Nonaka in 1990, the model was further developed by Hirotaka Takeuchi and is thus known as the Nonaka–Takeuchi model. In this model, tacit knowledge is presented variously as uncodifiable ("tacit aspects of knowledge are those that cannot be codified") and codifiable ("transforming tacit knowledge into explicit knowledge is known as codification"). This ambiguity is common in the knowledge management literature.

Assuming that knowledge is created through the interaction between tacit and explicit knowledge, the Nonaka–Takeuchi model postulates four different modes of knowledge conversion:

1. from tacit knowledge to tacit knowledge, or socialization;
2. from tacit knowledge to explicit knowledge, or externalization;
3. from explicit knowledge to explicit knowledge, or combination; and
4. from explicit knowledge to tacit knowledge, or internalization.

Nonaka's view may be contrasted with Polanyi's original view of "tacit knowing". Polanyi believed that while declarative knowledge may be needed for acquiring skills, it is unnecessary for using those skills once the novice becomes an expert. Indeed, it does seem to be the case that, as Polanyi argued, when people acquire a skill, they acquire a corresponding understanding that defies articulation.

== Diffusion model ==
Tacit knowledge exchange in a company can be engineered as a diffusion process according to the Fourier's law of a heat transfer in physics. In the model proposed in, the surveys among employees can be used to construct a graph of possible knowledge flow - Tacit Knowledge Transfer Graph (TKTG). This allows one to arrange self-learning groups and identify the employees that are essential to the process distinguishing also:

- sources - employees that offer a large amount of teaching;
- sinks - employees that need extended knowledge transfer;

This approach allows to reduce "quiet quitting" and manage knowledge transfer.

== Examples ==
- One of the most convincing examples of tacit knowledge is facial recognition: one knows a person's face, and can recognize it among a thousand, indeed a million. Yet, people usually cannot tell how they recognize that face, so most of this cannot be put into words. When one sees a face, they are not conscious about their knowledge of the individual features (eye, nose, mouth), but rather see and recognize the face as a whole.
- Another example of tacit knowledge is the notion of language itself: it is not possible to learn a language just by being taught the rules of grammar—a native-speaker picks it up at a young age, almost entirely unaware of the formal grammar which they may be taught later.
- Other examples are how to ride a bike, how tight to make a bandage, or knowing whether a senior surgeon feels an intern may be ready to learn the intricacies of surgery; this can only be learned through personal experimentation.
- Harry M. Collins showed that Western laboratories long had difficulties in successfully replicating an experiment that a team led by Vladimir Braginsky at Moscow State University had been conducting for 20 years (the experiment was measuring the quality, Q, factors of sapphire). Western scientists became suspicious of the Russian results and it was only when Russian and Western scientists conducted the measurements collaboratively that the trust was reestablished. Collins argues that laboratory visits enhance the possibility for the transfer of tacit knowledge.
- The Bessemer steel process is another example: Henry Bessemer sold a patent for his advanced steelmaking process and was subsequently sued by the purchasers after they could not get it to work. In the end, Bessemer set up his own steel company because he knew how to do it, even though he could not convey it to his patent users.
- When Matsushita (now Panasonic) started developing its automatic home bread-making machine in 1985, an early problem was how to mechanize the dough-kneading process, a process that takes a master baker years of practice to perfect. To learn this tacit knowledge, a member of the software development team, Ikuko Tanaka, decided to volunteer herself as an apprentice to the head baker of the Osaka International Hotel, who was reputed to produce the area's best bread. After a period of imitation and practice, one day she observed that the baker was not only stretching, but also twisting the dough in a particular fashion ("twisting stretch"), which turned out to be important in the success of his method. The Matsushita home bakery team drew together eleven members from completely different specializations and cultures: product planning, mechanical engineering, control systems, and software development. The "twisting stretch" motion was finally achieved by a prototype machine after a year of iterative experimentation by the engineers and team members working closely together, combining their explicit knowledge. For example, the engineers added ribs to the inside of the dough case in order to hold the dough better as it is being churned. Another team member suggested a method (later patented) to add yeast at a later stage in the process, thereby preventing the yeast from over-fermenting in high temperatures.

== See also ==
- Activity theory
- Cognitive apprenticeship
- Concept map
- Consensus reality
- Decoding the Disciplines
- Decision making
- Descriptive knowledge
- Dispersed knowledge
- Fuzzy concept
- Hidden curriculum
- Intuition
- Knowledge by acquaintance
- Knowledge tagging
- Logical consequence
- Phronesis
- Procedural knowledge
- Situated knowledge
- Tacit assumption
- Text and conversation theory
- Threshold knowledge
- Unsaid
