= Knowledge assessment methodology =

The knowledge assessment methodology (KAM) is "an interactive benchmarking tool created by the World Bank's Knowledge for Development Program to help countries identify the challenges and opportunities they face in making the transition to the knowledge-based economy."

KAM does so by providing information on knowledge economy indicators for 146 countries. Its products include the Knowledge Economy Index and the Knowledge Index.
