= Electronic Journal of Knowledge Management =

- Discipline: Knowledge Management
- Language: English

Publication details
- History: 2003-present
- Publisher: Academic Conferences Limited (England)

Standard abbreviations
- ISO 4: Electron. J. Knowl. Manag.

Indexing
- ISSN: 1479-4411

Links
- Journal homepage

The Electronic Journal of Knowledge Management (EJKM) is a peer-reviewed academic journal that contributes to the development of both theory and practice in the field of knowledge management. It accepts academic papers, topical articles and case studies dealing with the research in, and practice of, knowledge management.

== See also ==
- Journal of Knowledge Management
- Journal of Knowledge Management Practice
