= Digital ecosystem =

Distributed, adaptive, open socio-technical system

A digital ecosystem is a distributed, adaptive, open socio-technical system with properties of self-organization, scalability and sustainability inspired from natural ecosystems. Digital ecosystem models are informed by the knowledge of natural ecosystems, especially for aspects related to competition and collaboration among diverse entities. The term is used in the computer industry, the entertainment industry, and the World Economic Forum. Modern theory of open and digital ecosystems represent dynamic, interconnected networks in which diverse participants, ranging from companies and institutions to startups and end-users, collaborate through digital platforms to co-create value across traditional organizational and industry boundaries.

== Definition ==
An open and digital ecosystem is a dynamic, platform-based network in which organizations and users collaborate across industry boundaries through the exchange of data, finance, and product information enabled by application programming interfaces (APIs). It builds on the principles of Open Innovation and Open Data, where value creation depends on the open sharing of ideas, data, and interfaces supported by digital infrastructure. Fasnacht emphasizes the convergence of commerce, social media, and finance - the so-called “Golden Triangle of Ecosystems” - as a central characteristic of such ecosystems, enabling integrated offerings such as digital platforms and super-apps.

== History ==
The concept of Digital Business Ecosystem was put forward in 2002 by a group of European researchers and practitioners, including Francesco Nachira, Paolo Dini and Andrea Nicolai, who applied the general notion of digital ecosystems to model the process of adoption and development of ICT-based products and services in competitive, highly fragmented markets like the European one . Elizabeth Chang, Ernesto Damiani and Tharam Dillon started in 2007 the IEEE Digital EcoSystems and Technologies Conference (IEEE DEST). Richard Chbeir, Youakim Badr, Dominique Laurent, and Hiroshi Ishikawa started in 2009 the ACM Conference on Management of Digital EcoSystems (MEDES).

== Perspectives ==
The digital ecosystem metaphor and models have been applied to a number of business areas related to the production and distribution of knowledge-intensive products and services, including higher education. The perspective of this research is providing methods and tools to achieve a set of objectives of the ecosystem (e.g. sustainability, fairness, bounded information asymmetry, risk control and gracious failure). These objectives are seen as desirable properties whose emergence should be fostered by the digital ecosystem self-organization, rather than as explicit design goals like in conventional IT.

== See also ==
- Oikos
- Ecology
- Ecosystem
- Information ecosystem
- Software ecosystem
- Platform ecosystem
- Knowledge commons
- Knowledge ecosystem
- Digital distribution
- Media ecology
- Social system
