= Journal of Knowledge Management Practice =

- Discipline: Knowledge management
- Language: English

Publication details
- Former name(s): Journal of Systemic Knowledge Management
- History: 1998-present
- Publisher: TLA, Inc. (Canada)
- Frequency: Quarterly

Standard abbreviations
- ISO 4: J. Knowl. Manag. Pract.

Indexing
- ISSN: 1705-9232
- OCLC no.: 51174510

Links
- Journal homepage

The Journal of Knowledge Management Practice is an interdisciplinary peer-reviewed quarterly academic journal covering knowledge management and its practical applications. It is published online in electronic format only.

== See also ==
- Electronic Journal of Knowledge Management
- Journal of Knowledge Management
