= Journal of Knowledge Management =

- Discipline: Knowledge management
- Language: English
- Edited by: Manlio Del Giudice

Publication details
- History: 1997–present
- Publisher: Emerald Insight
- Frequency: 10/year
- Impact factor: 9.5 (2025)

Standard abbreviations
- ISO 4: J. Knowl. Manag.

Indexing
- ISSN: 1367-3270
- LCCN: 99110965
- OCLC no.: 41891336

Links
- Journal homepage; Online archive

The Journal of Knowledge Management is a peer-reviewed academic journal covering knowledge management. According to the Journal Citation Reports, the journal has a 2025 impact factor of 9.5. It has been consistently ranked as the top peer-reviewed academic journal in the knowledge management discipline.

== See also ==
- Electronic Journal of Knowledge Management
- Journal of Knowledge Management Practice
