= Knowledge ecosystem =

Approach to knowledge management

The idea of a knowledge ecosystem is an approach to knowledge management which claims to foster the dynamic evolution of knowledge interactions between entities to improve decision-making and innovation through improved evolutionary networks of collaboration.

In contrast to purely directive management efforts that attempt either to manage or direct outcomes, knowledge digital ecosystems espouse that knowledge strategies should focus more on enabling self-organization in response to changing environments. The suitability between knowledge and problems confronted defines the degree of "fitness" of a knowledge ecosystem. Articles discussing such ecological approaches typically incorporate elements of complex adaptive systems theory. Known implementation considerations of knowledge ecosystem include the Canadian Government.

== Key elements ==
To understand knowledge ecology as a productive operation, it is helpful to focus on the knowledge ecosystem that lies at its core. Like natural ecosystems, these knowledge ecosystems have inputs, throughputs and outputs operating in open exchange relationship with their environments. Multiple layers and levels of systems may be integrated to form a complete ecosystem. These systems consist of interlinked knowledge resources, databases, human experts, and artificial knowledge agents that collectively provide an online knowledge for anywhere anytime performance of organizational tasks. The availability of knowledge on an anywhere-anytime basis blurs the line between learning and work performance. Both can occur simultaneously and sometimes interchangeably.

== Core technologies ==
Knowledge ecosystems operate on two types of technology cores – one involving content or substantive industry knowledge, and the other involving computer hardware and software – telecommunications, which serve as the "procedural technology" for performing operations. These technologies provide knowledge management capabilities that are far beyond individual human capabilities. In a corporate training context, a substantive technology would be knowledge of various business functions, tasks, R&D process products, markets, finances, and relationships. Research, coding, documentation, publication and sharing of electronic resources create this background knowledge. Computer-to-computer and human-to-human communications enable knowledge ecosystems to be interactive and responsive within a larger community and its subsystems.

== See also ==
- Collective intelligence
- Digital ecosystem
- Distributed cognition
- Ecosemiotics
- Ecosystem
- Global brain
- Information ecology
- Knowledge management
- Knowledge market
- Smart city
- Sociology of knowledge
