= Knowledge Economic Index =

The Knowledge Economy Index (KEI) was designed as a tool for benchmarking a country's position in relation to others in the global knowledge economy. It was created by the World Bank Institute using the Knowledge Assessment Methodology (KAM). The World Bank discontinued the index after 2012 and it was replaced by The Global Knowledge Index (GKI) from Knowledge4All, a joint initiative between the United Nations Development Programme (UNDP) and the Mohammed bin Rashid Al Maktoum Knowledge Foundation (MBRF). Criteria listed in a European Bank for Reconstruction and Development (EBRD) document on the KEI published in 2019 include institutional & legal frameworks (as a basis for patents etc.), number of technical graduates, research spending, number of patents, some measure of collaboration, and amount of venture capital. In total, 38 contributing indicators are described in the EBRD index methodology.

== Knowledge Index ==
The Knowledge Index (KI) is an economic indicator prepared by the World Bank Institute to measure a country's ability to generate, adopt and diffuse knowledge. Methodologically, the KI is the simple average of the normalized performance scores of a country or region on the key variables in three Knowledge Economy pillars – education and human resources, the innovation system, and information and communication technology (ICT).

== Knowledge Economic Index ==
The Knowledge Economy Index (KEI) takes into account whether the environment is conducive for knowledge to be used effectively for economic development. It is an aggregate index that represents the overall level of development of a country or region towards the Knowledge Economy. The KEI is calculated based on the average of the normalized performance scores of a country or region on all 4 pillars related to the knowledge economy - economic incentive and institutional regime, education and human resources, the innovation system and ICT.

== The 4 pillars of the Knowledge Economy framework ==
- An economic and institutional regime to provide incentives for the efficient use of existing and new knowledge and the flourishing of entrepreneurship;
- An educated and skilled population to create, share, and use knowledge well;
- An efficient innovation system of firms, research centers, universities, consultants and other organizations to tap into the growing stock of global knowledge, assimilate and adapt it to local needs, and create new technology;
- Information and communication technology to facilitate the effective creation, dissemination, and processing of information.

== KEI and KI indexes by country ==
Country	KEI	KI	Economic Incentive Regime	Innovation	Education	ICT	2015 Rank
Denmark	9.58	9.55	9.66	9.57	9.80	9.28	1
Sweden	9.52	9.63	9.18	9.79	9.40	9.69	2
Finland	9.37	9.33	9.47	9.66	9.78	8.56	3
Netherlands	9.32	9.36	9.18	9.48	9.26	9.36	4
Norway	9.27	9.27	9.25	9.06	9.60	9.16	5
Canada	9.21	9.14	9.42	9.43	9.26	8.74	6
Switzerland	9.15	9.03	9.50	9.89	7.69	9.52	7
United Kingdom	9.09	9.03	9.28	9.18	8.54	9.38	8
United States	9.08	9.05	9.16	9.45	8.77	8.93	9
Australia	9.05	9.17	8.66	8.72	9.64	9.16	10
Ireland	8.92	8.82	9.23	9.04	9.08	8.33	11
Austria	8.89	8.76	9.30	8.90	8.53	8.85	12
Iceland	8.88	8.87	8.92	7.98	9.44	9.18	13
Germany	8.87	8.83	8.99	9.00	8.46	9.04	14
New Zealand	8.87	9.00	8.48	8.65	9.79	8.56	15
Belgium	8.73	8.70	8.82	8.96	9.14	8.02	16
Taiwan	8.69	8.80	8.35	9.24	7.91	9.26	17
Luxembourg	8.65	8.40	9.42	8.91	6.66	9.62	18
Japan	8.56	8.84	7.71	9.15	8.71	8.66	19
France	8.47	8.69	7.82	8.61	9.08	8.38	20
Estonia	8.34	8.22	8.68	7.49	8.27	8.90	21
Slovenia	8.25	8.29	8.11	8.31	8.24	8.33	22
Spain	8.24	8.13	8.58	8.14	8.21	8.04	23
Singapore	8.24	7.75	9.71	9.56	5.19	8.50	24
Israel	8.22	8.24	8.16	9.34	6.72	8.64	25
Hong Kong, China	8.20	7.73	9.60	8.64	5.30	9.26	26
Italy	7.86	8.19	6.84	8.04	7.86	8.68	27
Hungary	7.85	7.67	8.39	8.14	7.62	7.25	28
Czech Republic	7.83	7.70	8.23	7.60	8.11	7.39	29
Lithuania	7.68	7.60	7.94	6.59	8.36	7.84	30
South Korea	7.68	8.38	5.57	8.47	7.97	8.71	31
Latvia	7.64	7.51	8.04	6.40	8.41	7.73	32
Cyprus	7.55	7.47	7.77	7.65	6.45	8.32	33
Portugal	7.52	7.22	8.44	7.43	6.83	7.39	34
Greece	7.38	7.48	7.08	7.63	8.20	6.62	35
Poland	7.38	7.37	7.39	6.92	7.94	7.25	36
Slovakia	7.33	7.12	7.99	6.86	6.98	7.51	37
Barbados	7.25	7.78	5.66	7.51	8.40	7.44	38
Croatia	7.19	7.19	7.16	7.54	6.44	7.61	39
Chile	6.92	6.53	8.11	6.81	6.31	6.46	40
Bulgaria	6.80	6.73	7.01	6.43	7.42	6.33	41
United Arab Emirates	6.66	6.57	6.95	6.74	4.78	8.18	42
Romania	6.37	6.20	6.87	5.66	6.30	6.63	43
Uruguay	6.35	6.31	6.49	5.26	7.18	6.48	44
Qatar	6.15	6.20	5.99	5.77	5.29	7.56	45
Dominica	6.07	5.61	7.46	3.76	6.24	6.82	46
Costa Rica	6.06	5.85	6.70	6.24	5.01	6.30	47
Malaysia	6.06	6.02	6.18	6.83	4.14	7.08	48
Russian Federation	5.40	6.69	1.55	6.89	7.09	6.08	49
Bahrain	6.02	5.75	6.84	4.20	5.82	7.22	50
Kuwait	6.01	5.68	7.01	5.05	4.87	7.13	51
Ukraine	5.80	6.38	4.06	5.77	7.91	5.45	52
Argentina	5.49	6.44	2.63	6.85	6.49	5.98	53
Trinidad and Tobago	5.64	5.54	5.95	6.02	4.34	6.27	54
Brazil	5.57	6.00	4.30	6.07	5.84	6.08	55
Turkey	5.61	5.14	7.02	5.67	4.38	5.38	56
South Africa	5.55	5.47	5.81	6.92	4.51	4.98	57
Jordan	5.53	5.46	5.77	5.66	5.49	5.21	58
Armenia	5.51	5.44	5.71	6.17	6.32	3.84	59
Mexico	5.45	5.48	5.38	5.82	4.85	5.77	60
Thailand	5.44	5.41	5.51	5.98	5.27	5.00	61
Oman	5.37	4.72	7.32	4.95	4.30	4.90	62
North Macedonia	5.33	5.23	5.61	4.76	4.87	6.06	63
Mauritius	5.18	4.58	6.95	3.70	4.09	5.96	64
Saudi Arabia	5.15	5.07	5.39	4.04	4.87	6.29	65
Jamaica	5.04	5.40	3.99	5.36	4.10	6.74	66
Moldova	5.04	5.32	4.19	4.39	6.40	5.17	67
Kazakhstan	5.01	5.08	4.82	3.77	7.21	4.25	68
Belarus	4.93	6.39	0.55	5.54	8.00	5.63	69
Lebanon	4.86	4.91	4.70	4.69	4.76	5.27	70
Tunisia	4.73	4.56	5.26	4.58	4.10	5.00	71
Panama	4.69	4.45	5.39	5.45	4.86	3.04	72
Georgia	4.69	5.07	3.54	5.38	5.97	3.85	73
Peru	4.64	4.86	3.98	3.88	5.57	5.12	74
Mongolia	4.50	4.28	5.18	2.06	6.31	4.46	75
Colombia	4.42	4.62	3.83	4.26	4.79	4.80	76
China	4.35	4.46	4.01	5.12	4.11	4.16	77
Guyana	4.31	4.97	2.33	4.47	5.80	4.64	78
Philippines	4.25	4.02	4.95	3.63	4.76	3.66	79
Venezuela	4.23	5.47	0.51	5.73	5.27	5.41	80
Namibia	4.19	3.20	7.14	3.30	2.57	3.74	81
Sri Lanka	4.16	4.07	4.44	4.44	4.91	2.85	82
Albania	4.04	4.08	3.91	3.10	4.94	4.20	83
Egypt	4.03	4.19	3.57	4.55	4.35	3.66	84
Botswana	3.96	3.50	5.34	4.34	2.58	3.59	85
Dominican Republic	3.92	3.81	4.24	2.91	4.11	4.42	86
El Salvador	3.91	3.65	4.70	3.19	3.26	4.50	87
Azerbaijan	3.81	3.93	3.42	3.05	5.03	3.73	88
Kyrgyzstan	3.74	3.90	3.25	2.70	6.25	2.75	89
Paraguay	3.62	3.87	2.87	3.47	4.20	3.93	90
Ecuador	3.46	4.08	1.58	3.55	3.77	4.93	91
Morocco	3.45	3.33	3.80	3.67	2.00	4.32	92
Bolivia	3.42	3.63	2.78	3.05	4.76	3.09	93
Iran	3.39	4.13	1.18	3.02	3.89	5.48	94
Uzbekistan	3.28	4.03	1.03	3.51	6.17	2.40	95
Algeria	3.25	3.50	2.53	3.48	3.64	3.37	96
Cape Verde	3.24	3.05	3.81	2.25	2.96	3.96	97
Indonesia	3.23	3.19	3.36	3.32	3.42	2.82	98
Honduras	3.21	3.18	3.30	3.30	3.17	3.06	99
India	3.12	2.94	3.67	3.97	2.26	2.59	100
Guatemala	3.11	2.88	3.78	2.47	2.21	3.97	101
Vietnam	3.02	3.08	2.85	2.83	3.32	3.08	102
Swaziland	2.93	3.05	2.56	4.55	1.73	2.88	103
Syrian Arab Republic	2.90	3.34	1.55	3.44	2.91	3.68	104
Nicaragua	2.87	2.64	3.57	1.99	2.93	3.02	105
Kenya	2.82	2.65	3.31	3.87	1.49	2.60	106
Tajikistan	2.79	2.93	2.37	2.33	5.34	1.10	107
Senegal	2.63	2.15	4.07	2.77	0.92	2.75	108
Zimbabwe	2.51	3.25	0.29	4.09	2.38	3.29	109
Ghana	2.50	2.00	3.97	2.08	1.80	2.13	110
Uganda	2.46	1.93	4.04	2.72	1.16	1.92	111
Madagascar	2.37	1.51	4.93	2.54	0.76	1.25	112
Mauritania	2.35	1.83	3.89	1.75	0.94	2.80	113
Tanzania	2.28	1.72	3.98	2.39	1.05	1.70	114
Pakistan	2.24	2.18	2.43	2.75	1.07	2.72	115
Lesotho	2.15	1.99	2.65	2.70	1.73	1.53	116
Benin	2.10	1.80	3.00	2.33	1.14	1.93	117
Nigeria	2.04	2.33	1.16	2.72	1.87	2.41	118
Yemen	1.80	1.83	1.72	1.68	1.83	1.99	119
Mali	1.78	1.18	3.58	1.69	0.66	1.19	120
Mozambique	1.71	1.20	3.24	1.86	0.33	1.41	121
Angola	1.70	1.67	1.76	2.44	0.88	1.70	122
Cameroon	1.69	1.85	1.20	2.49	1.36	1.70	123
Burkina Faso	1.64	1.11	3.24	2.15	0.26	0.93	124
Nepal	1.61	1.46	2.06	2.04	1.50	0.84	125
Malawi	1.55	1.17	2.71	2.11	0.87	0.53	126
Laos	1.53	1.68	1.08	1.43	2.01	1.59	127
Bangladesh	1.49	1.63	1.10	1.71	1.52	1.66	128
Myanmar	1.48	1.52	1.35	1.17	2.58	0.82	129
Rwanda	1.34	0.85	2.80	1.47	0.35	0.74	130
Ethiopia	1.18	0.93	1.95	1.57	0.73	0.48	131
Djibouti	1.15	1.14	1.19	1.29	0.49	1.63	132
Eritrea	1.07	1.20	0.68	1.56	0.81	1.22	133
Sierra Leone	0.91	0.92	0.87	1.70	0.67	0.39	134
Bosnia and Herzegovina	n/a	n/a	4.24	3.29	n/a	5.33	135
Serbia and Montenegro	n/a	n/a	3.46	4.85	n/a	5.59	136
Haiti	n/a	n/a	1.29	1.15	n/a	1.57	137
Côte d'Ivoire	n/a	n/a	0.57	2.52	n/a	2.30	138
Sudan	n/a	n/a	0.61	1.97	n/a	3.84	139
Zambia	n/a	n/a	2.97	2.37	n/a	2.03	140
