= List of knowledge management topics =

This is a list of Knowledge management topics.

== Types of knowledge management ==
- Personal knowledge management - focuses on individual responsibility for learning, connecting, organizing and producing knowledge. This is closely tied to blogging, personal information management and branding.

== Branches of knowledge management ==
- Business intelligence

== Focus of knowledge management ==
- Knowledge

== Sources of knowledge ==
- Tacit knowledge
- Collective intelligence
- Corporate memory - a collection of best practices, heuristics, process documents and other texts that help define how a business operates. (related terms: organizational memory or group memory). Capturing, maintaining, and growing a knowledge base, selecting appropriate technologies, and motivating quality contributions are all key KM themes.
- Intellectual capital - the intangible assets of a firm. These include competencies, culture and connections that enable and foster innovation, agility, awareness, adaptation and corporate survival. KM plays a role in mapping, recording, evaluating, stewarding, marketing and growing intellectual capital and knowledge assets.

== Knowledge management operations ==
- Data mining
- Knowledge organization
- Knowledge representation
- Knowledge transfer
- Knowledge translation

=== Knowledge management automation ===
- Knowledge base
- Knowledge graph
- Knowledge-based system
- Knowledge engineering
- Knowledge management software
- Business intelligence
- Enterprise content management
- Wiki software

== The business of knowledge management ==
- Customer relationship management
- Intellectual capital
- Knowledge economy
- Knowledge intensive services
- Knowledge intensive business services
- Knowledge organization (management)
- Knowledge enterprise
- Knowledge sharing
- Supply chain management

== Participants in knowledge management ==
- Knowledge worker
- Chief knowledge officer
- Virtual team
- Communities of innovation
- Community of practice
- Community of interest

== Knowledge management media ==
=== Knowledge management periodicals ===
- Journal of Knowledge Management
- Knowledge Management Research & Practice
