= Computational knowledge economy =

The computational knowledge economy is an economy 'where value is derived from the automated generation of knowledge.

The term was coined by Conrad Wolfram to describe the extension to the knowledge economy caused by ubiquitous access to automated computation. Wolfram argues "The value- chain of knowledge is shifting. The question is not whether you have knowledge but know how to compute new knowledge from it, almost always applying computing power to help."

== Impact on education ==
It has been argued that the skills needed by the computational knowledge economy are radically different, needing an emphasis on coding, math and computational thinking. In his book Education in the Creative Economy ISBN 978-1433107443 Daniel Araya has argued that "as this "computational knowledge economy expands and matures, it is facilitating deep structural changes in the U.S. labor force"

Projects such as Computer-Based Math are attempting to rethink school curricula to prepare for the computational knowledge economy

== See also ==
- Digital economy
- Information economy
- Smart city
- Internet economy
- Knowledge market
- Knowledge organization
- Knowledge Revolution
- Knowledge tagging
- Knowledge value chain
- Learning economy
- Network economy
- Productivity improving technologies (historical)
