= Knowledge intensive services =

Activities aimed at the practical use of knowledge

Knowledge-intensive services, abbreviated as KIS, are services that involve activities that are intended to result in the creation, accumulation, or dissemination of knowledge. The term "knowledge-intensiveness" refers to the processes involved in knowledge production and dissemination, which are characterized by a significant intellectual value-add. Knowledge intensive business services (commonly known as KIBS) are the knowledge-intensive service activities for developing a customized service or product solutions to satisfy the needs of clients in other companies or organizations. These concepts are continuously discussed, formulated, and developed as a part of the constantly evolving academic discipline of knowledge management.

Knowledge-intensive services occupy a central position as an integrator of the innovation system, which by knowledge-intensive processes enables information, people, and systems to interact and where companies, research institutions, and other innovative organizations drive technological and service innovations forward for the advancement of research and development, as well as for business and entrepreneurial purposes.

Knowledge-intensive services are a specialized part of knowledge-work and knowledge economy, where the main capital of a knowledge worker is the ability to develop and use knowledge at knowledge organizations or knowledge-intensive companies, also known as KICs. The role of knowledge-intensive services is enabled by numerous and versatile contacts with different actors at knowledge market. Knowledge-intensive services could act as an external knowledge source and contribute to innovations in client companies and introduce internal innovations and contribute to the actors’ economic performance and growth.

Knowledge-intensive service activities, abbreviated as KISA, play several important roles in innovation processes. They serve as sources of innovation by initiating and developing innovation activities in client organizations. Secondly, they serve as facilitators of innovation when they support an organization in the innovation process. Thirdly, they serve as carriers of innovation when they aid in transferring existing knowledge among or within organizations, industries, or networks so that it can be applied in a new context.

Knowledge-intensive services can be described as activities that are based on knowledge and know-how resources and are service oriented. This is a more descriptive concept than a specific industry: the information creates value for different stakeholders. Typical knowledge-intensive services activities features are, that information plays a significant role in the production of services and that the services are based on professional competence. The new knowledge is created and shared in a close interaction between the customer and the service provider. The end products are usually very innovative, intangible, and complex by their technical solutions.

== Knowledge work ==
Knowledge work is one of the forms in knowledge-intensive services. One of the most valuable assets of a 21st-century institution is its knowledge workers and their productivity. Knowledge workers can be defined as workers, who create knowledge or use knowledge as their main resource. Knowledge work does not involve the transformation of materials into another form but transforming knowledge from one form to another.

== Service thinking ==
Service thinking is a new theoretical philosophy for enterprise value creation. It aims to improve the customer experience and interactions by marketing and designing services. Service thinking combines different methods and tools from various disciplines. Service thinking approaches, like service logic, customer-dominant logic, service-dominant logic, and goods-dominant logic, help explain value creation.

== Service design ==
Service design is a customer-driven approach to service development. It aims to implement the service thinking theory. Service thinking helps to innovate and improve services to make them more desirable for clients.

== See also ==
- Knowledge intensive business services (KIBS)
- Innovation
- Innovation system
- Technological innovation
- Service innovation
- Knowledge economy
- Knowledge worker
- Knowledge organization (management)
- Knowledge-intensive company (KIC)
- Knowledge market
- Business network
