= Knowledge organization (management) =

A knowledge organization is a management idea, describing an organization in which people use systems and processes to generate, transform, manage, use, and transfer knowledge-based products and services to achieve organizational goals.

== Overview ==
From a functional perspective, in a knowledge organization, content (objects, data, information, knowledge, and wisdom) are generated by knowledge workers. Content is captured, organized, and preserved to enable its reuse and leveraging by people and groups other than those who generated it. Infrastructure is in place to enable sharing of content across all elements of an organization and with external partners, as appropriate. Procedures are in place to integrate content from multiple sources and mobilize it to achieve organizational goals and objectives. A learning culture promotes not only individual learning but also results in a shared understanding. Finally, the organization embraces continuous evolutionary change to sustain itself in a constantly changing environment.

Simard et al. (2007) described five functions of a knowledge-service organization:

1. generate content
2. transform content into useful products and services
3. preserve and manage content to enable organizational use and external transfer
4. use content to achieve organizational goals
5. transfer content externally, in the form of products and services

Functions 1, 3, and 5 are essential and cannot be bypassed.

A knowledge organization also links past, present, and future by capturing and preserving knowledge in the past, sharing and mobilizing knowledge today, and knowledge organizations can be viewed from a number of perspectives: their general nature, networks, behavior, human dimensions, communications, intelligence, functions and services.

== History ==
In the 1970s Peter Drucker (1974) may have been the first to describe knowledge workers and knowledge work.

Knowledge is created and used by people. Strassman (1985) described the transformation of work in the electronic age from the standpoint of education and training for managers and employees, human aspects of the working environment, and issues of morale, motivation, privacy, and displacements.

In 1990 Charles M. Savage observed that the nature of an organization based on knowledge rather than industrial society notions of land, labor, or capital was not well understood. Mcgee and Prusak (1993) noted that core competencies are not what an organization owns, but rather what it knows.

Bartlett (1999) indicates that empowerment is not possible in an autocratic organization, that networks cannot be sustained in fixed hierarchical structure, and that learning is not possible in an environment constrained by rigid policies and procedures.

Davenport (1997) used an information ecology approach, in which he explored the use and abuse of information in the context of infighting, resource hoarding, and political battles as well as appropriate management in such a context.

Simard (2000) states that knowledge is inextricably linked to organizational mandates. Some providers strive for objectivity, others selectively disseminate information and knowledge, while still others use information to further their agenda. Users must understand that information is not innocent, and that all information is not created equal.

== Knowledge organization topics ==
=== Network dimension ===
Knowledge organizations have a network dimension. Davis (1977) states that networks would not replace hierarchies, but that the two would coexist within a broader organizational concept.

Similarly, Amidon (1997) points out that traditional industrial-era hierarchies are neither flexible nor fluid enough to mobilize an organization's intellectual capacity and that much less constrained networked organizational forms are needed for modern decision making.

Tapscott (1998) notes that there is an underlying logic and order to the emerging digital organizational form. It is networked, involves multiple enterprises, is based on core competencies, and knowledge is actively created, exchanged, and used.

=== Behavioral approach ===
There is also a behavioral approach. Bartlett (1999)[9] indicates that organizational structure is just a skeleton. Knowledge organizations also have a physiology in the form of the flow of information and knowledge, as life-blood. They also have a psychology represented by people's values and how they act as individuals and collectively.

=== Collective intelligence ===
Knowledge organizations also have collective intelligence. Liautaut (2001) points out that in the knowledge economy, being an intelligent business is not only a prerequisite to winning, but even to compete in the first place. In a fluid, fast-paced knowledge market, companies that can find and exploit the slightest advantage for faster, better decision making will dominate. He also indicates that the greater the exchange of data and information across an organization, the more intelligent it will be.

=== Organizational knowledge ===
The knowledge in organizations is more complicated. Except from formal and informal documents, Davenport & Prusak’s (1998) also introduced routines, processes, practices and norms. It may therefore be clear that organizational knowledge is much more than a sum of all the individual knowledge (see Bhatt, 2000a). In a survey conducted by Cranfield University (1998) it became clear that most of the knowledge an organization needs, already exists in the organization, but that finding and identifying it were the problems (see also Hinds &Pfeffer, 2001). This has several explanations.

- First of all it depends how the knowledge in an organization is organized. Hansen et al. (1999) made a distinction between a codification and personalization strategy. A codification strategy focuses as the word already implicates, to codify knowledge in a company, where a personalization strategy implies personal interaction as the main factor for exchanging knowledge. Both strategies have their problems. First of all it is in many cases not possible to codify knowledge because of e.g. codifiability and complexity (see Kogut and Zander, 1992 for a very clear and elaborated study on this subject). This is called cognitive limitations (Hinds & Pfeffer, 2001). Hinds & Pfeffer (2001, pp4) argue that:
  As expertise increases, mental representations become more abstract and simplified
- And even if people can share knowledge, sometimes they do not want to. Hinds & Pfeffer (2001) call this motivational limitations. Hall et al. (2001) see rewards and informal activities with colleagues as the solution for the so-called motivational limitations. They divided the rewards in two groups, the explicit and the soft rewards. Explicit rewards are e.g. economic incentives and career advancement. Soft rewards are non-economic rewards such as reputation and satisfaction.

=== Formal and informal knowledge sharing ===
All this theory is based on formal structures in an organization. Organizations all also exist out informal ties and networks. This complicates organizational goals of formal knowledge sharing. A company will lose track of who has what knowledge because of the informal networks. This does not mean that informal networks are negative, just on the contrary, informal networks can create ties and surroundings which are necessary for knowledge sharing (see Brown & Deguid, 2001). Informal networks have received different names in the literature such as sensemaking (Weick, 1979), communities of practice (Brown & Deguid 1998) and communities of knowing (Boland &Tenkasi, 1995), Nikolai Groups (Nikolaivitch 1956). As Pan & Leidner (2003) argue in their paper, communities of practice exist because functional boundaries do not fit the community boundaries. They state (pp 73): “facilitate an environment of 'structured informality' supported by knowledge, people, organizational processes and infrastructure.”

The implication and unfortunately also the complication of informal networks is that an organization loose the general view of the knowledge in the organization. As showed by Cross et al. (2001) an informal structure significantly differs of the formal one. To effectively maximize the potential the authors argue that it is necessary to analyze both structures. They introduce the so-called Social Network analysis which systematically assesses informal networks. Knowledge consequently can be collected from formal and informal networks to create a socio-knowledge matrix in organizations.

== Organisational effectiveness ==
Zheng et al. (2010) studied mediating role of knowledge management and the findings indicate that knowledge management is not only an independent managerial practice, but also a central mechanism that leverages organizational cultural, structural, and strategic influence on organizational effectiveness. Greiner et al. (2007) concluded a strong relationship between the success of knowledge management in terms of improving business performance of the organization and the alignment of KM strategy and business strategy.

According to Greiner et al. (2007) two different knowledge management strategies have been discussed in the literature for sharing tacit and explicit knowledge. The codification strategy focuses on collecting knowledge, storing it in databases and providing the knowledge in an explicit and codified form. Personalization strategy focuses instead on transferring, communicating and exchanging knowledge by utilising information technology. From the elements of the business strategy and knowledge management strategy can be formulate four different combinations. However, Greiner et al. (2007) suggest that if business strategy focuses on innovation then primarily should be relied on personalization strategy and respectively in case of efficiency then codification should have priority.

== See also ==
- Digital Economy
- Information economy
- Information Market
- Information Society
- Internet Economy
- Knowledge market
- Knowledge policy
- Knowledge Revolution
- Knowledge workers
- Knowledge Value
- Network Economy
- Personal information management
- Knowledge sharing
