= Service innovation =

Service concept

Service innovation is used to refer to many things. These include but not limited to:

1. Innovation in services, in service products – new or improved service products (commodities or public services). Often this is contrasted with "technological innovation", though service products can have technological elements. This sense of service innovation is closely related to service design and "new service development".
2. Innovation in service processes – new or improved ways of designing and producing services. This may include innovation in service delivery systems, though often this will be regarded instead as a service product innovation. Innovation of this sort may be technological, technological - or expertise -based, or a matter of work organization (e.g. restructuring of work between professionals and paraprofessionals).
3. Innovation in service firms, organizations, and industries – organizational innovations, as well as service product and process innovations, and the management of innovation processes, within service organizations.

== Definitions ==
The Finnish research agency TEKES defines service innovation as "a new or significantly improved service concept that is taken into practice. It can be for example a new customer interaction channel, a distribution system or a technological concept or a combination of them. A service innovation always includes replicable elements that can be identified and systematically reproduced in other cases or environments. The replicable element can be the service outcome or the service process as such or a part of them. A service innovation benefits both the service producer and customers and it improves its developer's competitive edge. A service innovation is a service product or service process that is based on some technology or systematic method. In services however, the innovation does not necessarily relate to the novelty of the technology itself but the innovation often lies in the non-technological areas. Service innovations can for instance be new solutions in the customer interface, new distribution methods, novel application of technology in the service process, new forms of operation with the supply chain or new ways to organize and manage services."

Another definition proposed by Van Ark et al. (2003) states it as a "new or considerably changed service concept, client interaction channel, service delivery system or technological concept that individually, but most likely in combination, leads to one or more (re)new(ed) service functions that are new to the firm and do change the service/good offered on the market and do require structurally new technological, human or organizational capabilities of the service organization." This definition covers the notions of technological and non-technological innovation. Non-technological innovations in services mainly arise from investment in intangible inputs.

== Service Innovation Research ==
Many literatures on what makes for successful innovations of this kind comes from the New Service Development research field (e.g. Johne and Storey, 1998; Nijssen et al., 2006). Service design practitioners have also extensively discussed the features of effective service products and experiences. One of the key aspects of many service activities is the high involvement of the client/customer/user in the production of the final service. Additionally, firms cooperate with both horizontal (e.g., competitors) and vertical (e.g., suppliers) business partners in order to develop relevant service innovations. Without this co-production (i.e. interactivity of service production), the service would often not be created. This co-production, together with the intangibility of many service products, causes service innovation to often take forms rather different from those familiar through studies of innovation in manufacturing. Innovation researchers have, for this reason, stressed that much service innovation is hard to capture in traditional categories like product or process innovation, and that its effects are diverse. The co-production process, and the interactions between service provider and client, can also form the focus of innovation. A growing number of professional associations have service sections that promote service innovation research, including INFORMS, ISSIP, and others.

=== Areas of innovation – den Hertog's model ===
Thus den Hertog (2000) who identifies four "dimensions" of service innovation, takes quite a different direction to much standard innovation theorizing.

1. The Service Concept refers to a service concept that is new to its particular market – a new service in effect, or in Edvardsson's (1996, 1997) terminology, a "new value proposition". Many service innovations involve fairly intangible characteristics of the service, and others involve new ways of organizing solutions to problems (be these new or familiar ones). Examples might include new types of bank account or information service. In some service sectors, such as retail, there is much talk about "formats", such as the organization of shops in different ways (more or less specialized, more or less focused on quality or cost-saving, etc.).
2. The Client Interface refers to innovation in the interface between the service provider and its customers. Clients are often highly involved in service production, and changes in the way in which they play their roles and are related to suppliers can be major innovations for many services. Examples might include a greater amount of self-service for clients visiting service organizations. There is a French literature on service innovation that focuses especially on this type of innovation, identifying it as innovation in "servuction".
3. The Service Delivery System also often relates to the linkage between the service provider and its client, since delivery does involve an interaction across this interface. However, there are also internal organizational arrangements that relate to the ways in which service workers perform their job so as to deliver the critical services. Much innovation concerns the electronic delivery of services, but we can also think of, for instance, transport and packaging innovations (e.g. pizza delivery). An emerging concept of SDP is the idea of taking a "factory" approach to Service Innovation. A "service factory" approach is a standardized and industrialized environment for more effective service innovation, development and operations for the IP era.
4. Technological Options resemble most familiar process innovation in manufacturing sectors. New information technology is especially important to services, since it allows for greater efficiency and effectiveness in the information-processing elements that are, as we have seen, prevalent to a great extent in services sectors. We also often see physical products accompanying services, such as customer loyalty cards and "smart" RFID cards for transactions, and a wide range of devices for communication services.

In practice, the majority of service innovations will almost certainly involve various combinations of these four dimensions. For instance:

- A new IT system (technology dimension) may be used to enable customer self-service (interface dimension) as in the case of a bank contacting its customers.
- The ability to track one's order or the location of an item that one has posted or is expecting to receive.
- Services may be delivered electronically, as in the case of much online banking and cash withdrawals from ATMs.
- A new service allowing a client to examine various options and calculate what they would be paying with different types of accounts.
- A new service will often require a new service delivery system, and changes at the client interface.

An elaboration of this model to suggest six dimensions of innovation was developed in the course of work on creative sectors, by Green, Miles and Rutter. As well as Technology and Production process, four dimensions were specified whose linkages are very strong in creative sectors like videogames, advertising and design: Cultural Product, Cultural Concept, Delivery and User Interface.

The service innovation literature is surprisingly poorly related to the literature on new product development, which has spawned a line of study on new service development. This often focuses on the managerially important issue of what makes for successful service innovation. See for example Johne and Storey (1998),^{4} who reviewed numerous New Service Development studies.

=== Services Features and Innovation Potential: Miles (1993) influential article on 'Service Innovation' ===
Ian Miles of the Manchester Institute of Innovation Research (MIoIR), The University of Manchester, is one of the scholars on the study of 'Service Innovation'. He coined the term in his 1993 article in the journal FUTURES, (Vol. 25, No. 6, pp. 653–672,) . He listed a series of characteristic features of services, and associated these with particular types of innovation. Such innovations are often aimed at overcoming problems associated with service characteristics like the difficulty in demonstrating the service to the client, or the problems in storing and building up stocks of the service.

After Miles (1993), numerous studies were made, one of the more recent studies that reaches similar conclusions was from a qualitative survey of service organizations by Candi (2007).) Note that the "product" related innovations below have a lot in common with new service development as discussed above. In the following list, features of services are linked to innovation strategies by the symbol >>>.

1. Features of services associated with service production
  1. Technology and Plant (Low levels of capital equipment; heavy investment in buildings >>> Reduce costs of buildings by use of teleservices, toll-free phone numbers, etc.)
  2. Labor (Some services highly professional, esp. requiring interpersonal skills); others relatively unskilled, often involving casual or part-time labor. Specialist knowledge may be important, but rarely technological skills (other than Information Technology) >>> Reduce reliance on expensive and scarce skills by use of expert systems and related innovations; Relocation of key operations to areas of low labor costs (using telecommunications to maintain coordination).
  3. Organization of Labor Process (Workforce often engaged in craft-like production with limited management control of details of work. >>> Use IT to monitor workforce (e.g. tachometers and mobile communications for transport staff; Aim for 'flatter' organizational structures, with data from field and front-office workers directly entering databases and thence Management Information Systems.)
  4. Features of Production (Production is often non-continuous and economies of scale are limited >>> Standardize production (e.g. 'fast-food' chains), reorganize in more assembly-line-like feature with more standard components and higher division of labor.)
  5. Organization of Industry (Some services state-run public services; Others often small-scale with high preponderance of family firms and self-employed >>> Externalization and privatization of public services; combination of small firms using network technologies; IT-based service management systems.)
2. Features of services associated with service product
  1. Nature of Product (Immaterial, often information-intensive; Hard to store or transport; Process and product hard to distinguish. >>> Add material components (e.g. client cards, membership cards). Use telematics for ordering, reservation, and if possible – delivery. Maintain elements of familiar 'user-interfaces'.)
  2. Features of Product (Often customized to consumer requirements.>>> Use of Electronic data interchange or Internet for remote input of client details; use software to record client requirements and match to service product.
3. Features of services associated with services consumption
  1. Delivery of Product (Production and consumption coterminous in time and space; often client or supplier has to move to meet the other party.>>> Telematics; Automated Teller Machines and equivalent information services.)
  2. Role of Consumer (Services are consumer-intensive, requiring inputs from consumer into design/production process.>>> Consumer use of standardized menus and new modes of delivering orders.)
  3. Organization of Consumption (Often hard to separate production from consumption; Self-service in formal and informal economies commonplace.>>> Increased use of self-service, utilizing existing consumer (or intermediate producer) technology – e.g. telephones, PCs – and user-friendly software interfaces.)
4. Features of services associated with services markets
  1. Organization of Markets (Some services delivered via public sector bureaucratic provision; some costs are invisibly bundled with goods (e.g. retail sector).>>> Introduction of quasi-markets and/or privatization of services; new modes of charging (pay per society), new reservation systems; more volatility in pricing using features of EPOS and related systems.)
  2. Regulation (Professional regulation common in some services.>>> Use of databases by regulatory institutions and service providers to supply and examine performance indicators and diagnostic evidence.)
  3. Marketing (Difficult to demonstrate products in advance.>>> Guarantees; demonstration packages (e.g. demo software, shareware, trial periods of use).)

Additionally, a number of general tendencies in the innovation process in services have been noted. These include:

1. The industrialization of services, involving efforts to standardize services, to yield service products of predictable characteristics and quality, with economies of scale and improved delivery times. This typically involves the introduction of high levels of division of labor, with the use of pre-packaged and automated elements (such as pre-prepared meals, word processed templates for form letters, and the like). Standardization of the service products has become a competitive strategy for many firms.
2. Organizational change is innovation. Survey data suggest that services place particular emphasis on organizational change. Many innovations in services involve combinations of specific new technologies together with organization change. The role of organizational innovations in services is very apparent – developments such as supermarkets and other self-service facilities are significant in the development of modern service industries. Such organizational innovations will often have a technological dimension, whether this be very basic (e.g. shopping trolleys), or relatively high-tech (EPOS – electronic point of sale – equipment or ATMs linked into networks).
3. An important trajectory of organizational change has been towards self-servicing, without necessarily following this development all the way toward the vision of the client sitting at home interacting with the service provider via a remote terminal. Instead, reorganization of the facilities of the service provider permits customer self-service in the service establishment, saving on labor costs and often increasing user satisfaction as it is possible to make decisions anonymously and at one's own pace.
4. Beyond self-servicing, the involvement of clients as coproducers is particularly important for knowledge-intensive business services, with the emphasis being laid upon clients' role in advancing the expertise of service suppliers, and identifying new avenues for its application. Web2.0 has brought "user innovation" to the fore in electronic services.

== Service Innovation using IoT and Big Data Analytics ==
In the traditional product-service system (PSS) business model, industries develop product with value-added service instead of single product itself, and provide their customers services that are needed. In this relationship, the market goal of manufacturers is not one-time product selling, but continuous profit from customers by total service solution, which can satisfy unmet customers' needs. Most of PSS systems focus on 'human-generated or human-related data' instead of 'machine-generated data or industrial data', which may include machine controllers, sensors, manufacturing systems, etc. Early work using web-based product monitoring for remote product services including GM OnStar Telematics, Otis Remote Elevator Maintenance (REM), and GE Medical InSite during the 1990s.

== Service innovation and public policy ==
In recent years policy makers have begun to consider the potential for promoting services innovation as part of their economic development strategies. Such consideration has, in part, been driven by the growing contribution that services activities make to national and regional economies. It also reflects the emerging recognition that traditional policy measures such as R&D grants and technology transfer supports have been developed from a manufacturing perspective of the innovation process.

The European Commission and the OECD has been particularly active in seeking to generate reflection on services innovation and its policy implications. This has resulted in studies such as the OECD's reports into knowledge intensive services, and the European Commission Expert Group report on services innovation – the report of the group, "Fostering Innovation in Services" as well as various TrendChart studies. The European Commission has also launched a number of Knowledge Intensive Services Platforms designed to act as laboratories for new public policies for services innovation. Few economic development agencies at the member state level, and fewer still at the regional level, have translated this new thinking on services innovation into policy action. Finland is an exception, where knowledge intensive business services have been a focus of much regional work (esp. the Uusimaa region).

Finland has been active in thinking about the policy implications of services innovation. This has seen TEKES – the Finnish Funding Agency for Technology and Innovation – launch the SERVE initiative, designed to support 'Finnish companies and research organizations in the development of innovative service concepts that can be reproduced or replicated and where some technology or systematic method is applied.'^{a} Germany has also undertaken initiatives for services R&D. Canada and Norway have programs as well.

Ireland has been considering a services-focused innovation policy, with Forfás – its national policy and advisory board for enterprise, trade, science, technology and innovation – having undertaken a review of Ireland's existing policy and support measures for innovation, and outlined options for a new policy and framework environment in support of service innovation activity.

At the regional level, limited information is available on how Europe's regions are responding to the challenges presented by service innovation. [CM International] has recently published a European survey on services innovation and regional policy responses. The results of this suggest that very few regions in France, the UK and Ireland have an explicit focus on services and innovation. Many do, however, express a desire to address this issue in the coming future.
