= Manchester Institute of Innovation Research =

Research institute based in Manchester Business School

Coordinates: 53.460811°N 2.229656°W

Manchester Institute of Innovation Research (MIoIR) is a research institute based in Alliance Manchester Business School at the University of Manchester, UK. MIoIR is a centre of excellence in the fields of innovation studies, technology management and innovation management, science policy, technology policy, innovation policy and regional innovation, the study of emerging technologies (or em tech), responsible research and innovation, and research into socio-technical transitions with a focus on sustainability and digital transitions. MIoIR has also been known for research on service innovation and in particular the definition and early exploration of the concept of knowledge-intensive business services, through the work of scholars such as Ian Miles and Bruce Tether.

The Institute consists of a group of internationally renowned scholars and experts, with more than 50 full members, approximately 30 PhD researchers, and a range of associated academics. Since the 1970s the institute and its predecessor bodies have contributed to the national and international debate about science policy and innovation (as noted in connection with UK debates by Agar) and helped develop the field of research evaluation and formulating the now widely used concept of behavioural additionality.

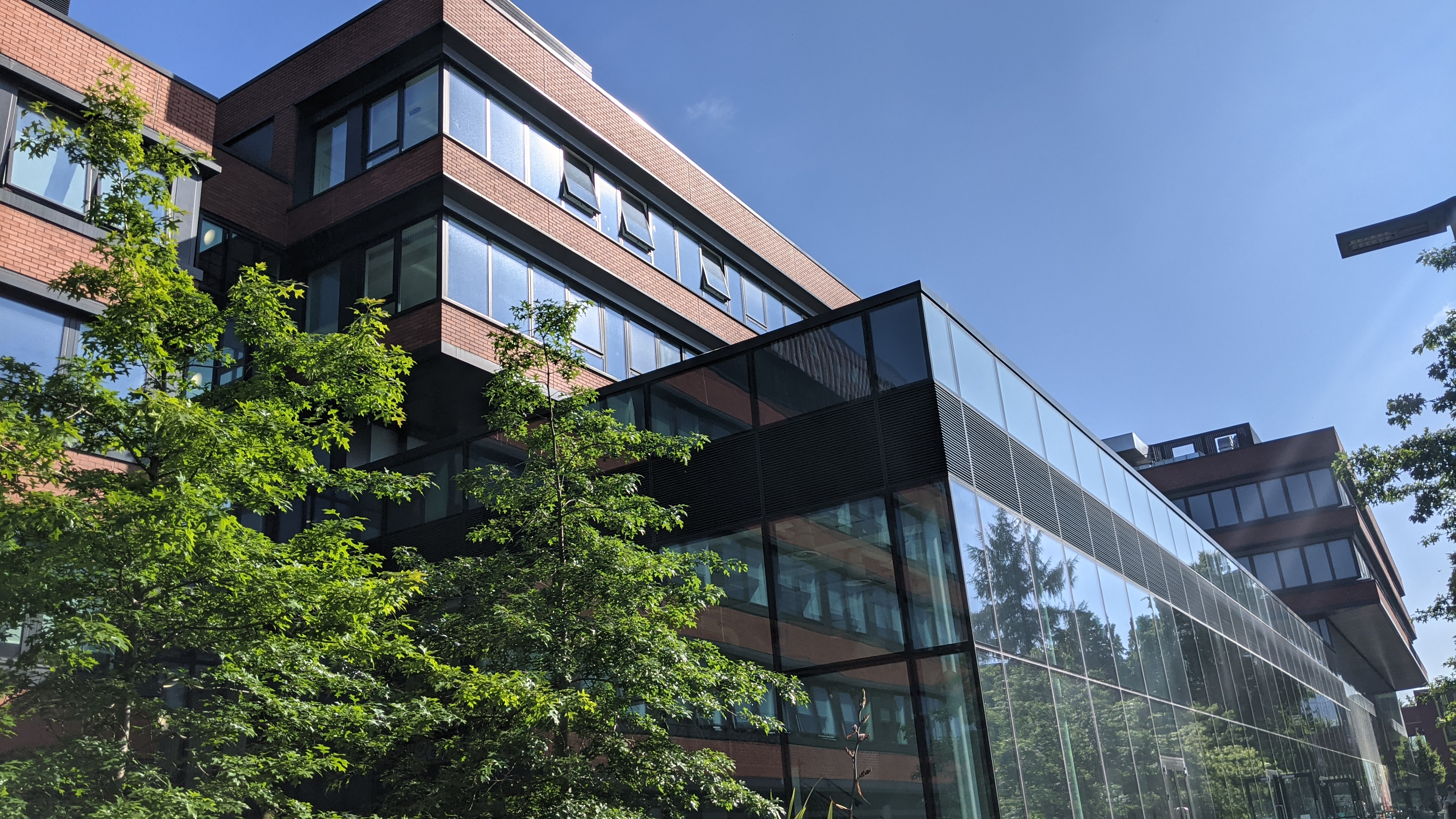
Alliance Manchester Business School building, home of MIoIR.

The Institute is currently housed in the newly refurbished Alliance Manchester Business School building on the corner of Oxford Road and Booth Street West, Manchester. For many of its earlier years it was based with the now-demolished Mathematics Tower of the University of Manchester.

A number of the current members of MIoIR are also co-investigators of, or otherwise affiliated with, the ESRC-funded Productivity Institute, a national virtual institute with its headquarters at Manchester.

== History ==
MIoIR has a history dating back to the 1960s, and the establishment of the Department of Liberal Studies in Science at the Victoria University of Manchester (VUM). The department was established in 1967 as part of a wave of science studies centres in the UK and North America established in the late 1960s and 1970s. As with many of these centres it was initially created in order to liberalise degree level science education and produce graduates literate both in a science field and in the history, philosophy, politics and economics of science who would, it was supposed, be better able to compete for top jobs in industry and government with graduates from humanities and social sciences programmes. The department eventually spawned two major research and teaching centres, the Centre for the History of Science, Technology and Medicine (CHSTM) and PREST (Policy Research in Engineering, Science and Technology) which evolved into the present-day Manchester Institute of Innovation Research in 2004, with the merger of the Victoria University with UMIST. The two centres continue to collaborate in the present, and host an annual public lecture in honour of the founding professor of Liberal Studies in Science, Frederick Raphael Jevons.

On its creation MIoIR also incorporated the remaining staff of the joint UMIST-VUM ESRC funded Centre for Research on Innovation and Competition (CRIC), a ten year collaborative research centre formed by Professors from PREST and UMIST that ran to September 2001.

== Notable members and graduates ==
- Frank Geels (currently Eddie Davies Professor of Sustainability Transitions at MIoIR, highly cited scholar)
- Luke Georghiou (former director, current member, Vice-President of the University of Manchester)
- Michael Gibbons (scientist) (former professor, co-author of The New Production of Knowledge (1994), former secretary general of the Association of Commonwealth Universities)
- Frederick Jevons (founding professor, later vice-chancellor of Deakin University)
- Trevor Pinch (M.Sc. graduate)
- Peter Hammill (Musician and graduate)
- Philip Gummett (former professor, former head of HEFCW)
- Jarlath Ronayne (academic and former vice-chancellor of the Victoria University of Technology)

== See also ==
- List of think tanks in the United Kingdom
- Research institute
- Category: Research institutes in the United Kingdom
