= University of Applied Sciences Kufstein =

University in Tyrol, Austria

- Fachhochschule Kufstein Tirol
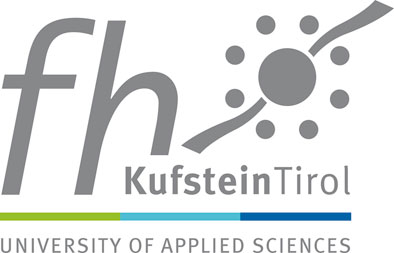
- Type: Public
- Established: 1997
- President: Prof. (FH) Dr. Thomas Madritsch
- Provost: Prof. (FH) PD Dr. Mario Döller
- Academic staff: 500
- Students: 2,200 (2019)
- Location: Kufstein, Tyrol, Austria; 47°35′02″N 12°10′25″E
- Campus: Suburban
- Website: UAS Kufstein Official Site

The University of Applied Sciences Kufstein, is an Austrian Fachhochschule in Kufstein, Tyrol.

== Organization ==
The University of Applied Sciences in Kufstein is an accredited provider of higher education in Austria. The university offers Bachelor and Master degrees as well as a post-graduate program. The university also hosts events and conferences pertaining to the various areas of studies.

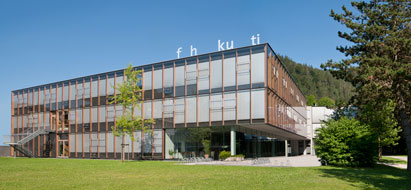
The University of Applied Sciences Kufstein Campus

The university employs approximately 350 professors and lecturers with either business or science backgrounds. Currently there are approximately 2,200 students enrolled in degree programs, including approx. 200 exchange students from around 50 countries who attend the various classes taught in English. Students enrolled in full-time bachelor's degree programs are required to participate in a study abroad program for at least one semester during their studies. Fifty percent of the degree programs are offered as part-time studies, which also enables employed professionals to study at weekends or in a blocked form. In April 2006, the cooperation agreement with the hundredth international partner university was concluded. At present, a network of more than 235 international partner universities is maintained, because the obligatory exchange program is an integral part of all degree programs.

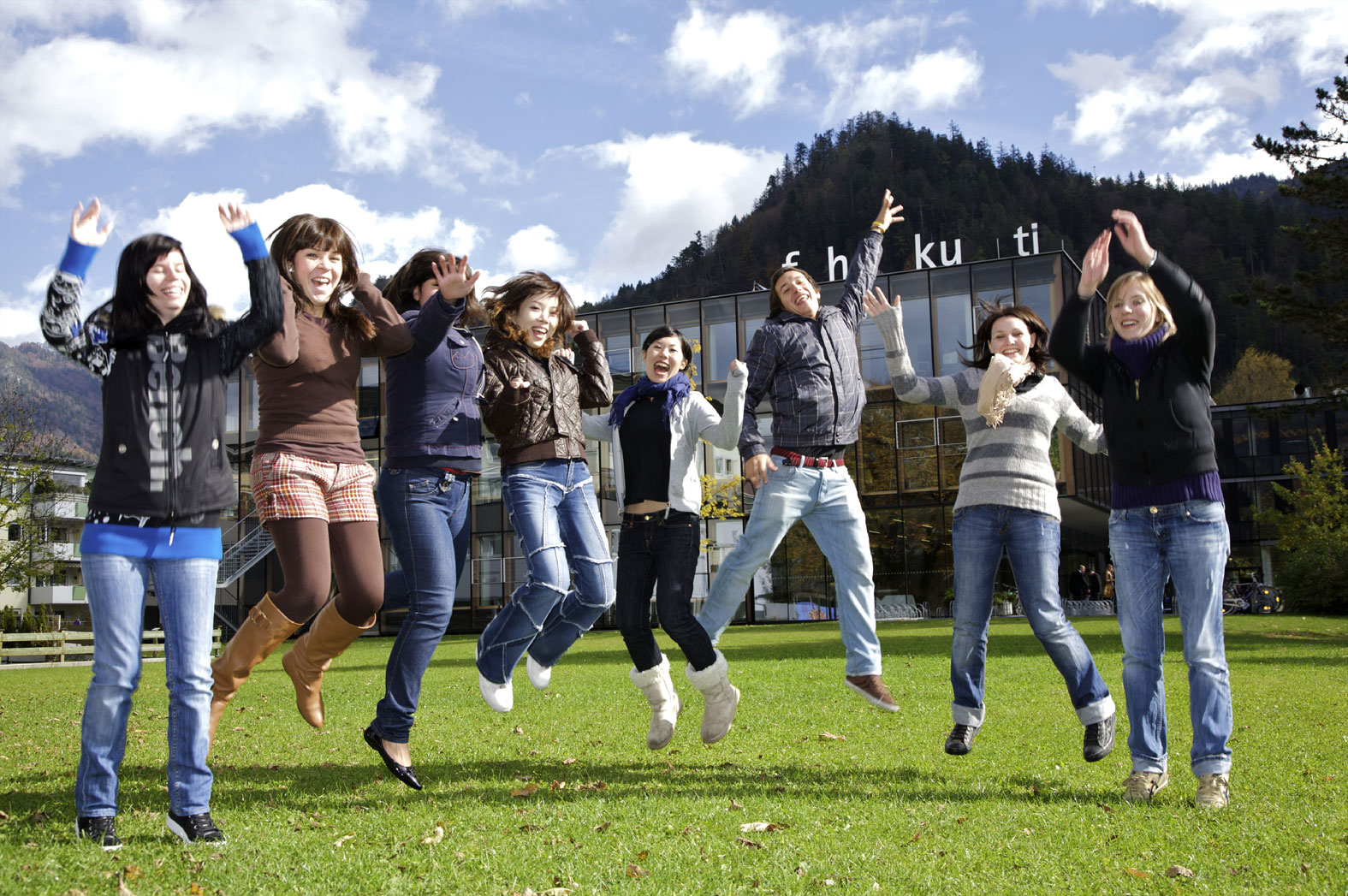
Incoming Students at the University of Applied Sciences Kufstein

== Accreditations & Certifications ==
The accreditations and certifications confirm conformity with prescribed standards and offer users and stakeholders of the University of Applied Sciences Kufstein help and support when choosing the institution where they wish to study. The University of Applied Sciences Kufstein and its study programs are accredited according to the Austrian University of Applied Sciences Studies Act. This accreditation confirms that the programs, which are inspected and evaluated at regular intervals, fulfil recognized standards applicable to universities of applied sciences.

In 2010 the University of Applied Sciences Kufstein underwent an institutional evaluation carried out by AQ Austria, the Agency for Quality Assurance and Accreditation Austria. This resulted in indefinite accreditation in line with Article 23 of the Act on Quality Assurance in Higher Education (HS-QSG).

ECTS & Diploma Supplement Label

University and Family Audit

The certification of the University of Applied Sciences Kufstein as a "family-friendly" university is the confirmation of concerted efforts to enable students at the institution to combine work, family and studies.

Unicert Accreditation

Unicert is a foreign-language education and certification system designed specifically for universities. Persons who have completed Unicert courses receive a certificate setting out in a clear and detailed manner the foreign languages skills they have acquired and the command they have of the language. This certificate can be used in both university and non-university settings.

== Degree Programs ==
=== Bachelor (6 semesters) ===
Language of Instruction: German, partly English (20-46%)

- Facility Management & Real Estate Management (Full-time/Part-time)
- International Business Studies (Full-time/Part-time)
- Sports, Culture & Event Management (Full-time/Part-time)
- Energy Business (Full-time)
- Business Management (Full-time)
- Web-Business & Technology (Full-time)
- Industrial Engineering & Management (Full-time)
- Marketing & Communication Management (Full-time/Part-time)

=== Master (4 semesters) ===
Language of Instruction: 100% English

- International Business Studies (Full-time)
- Sports, Culture & Events Management (Full-time)

Language of Instruction: German, partly English (14-35%)

- Corporate Restructuring (Part-time)
- Facility & Real Estate Management (Part-time)
- Sport, Culture & Event Management (Part-time)
- ERP Systems & Business Process Management (Part-time)
- European Energy Business (Part-time)
- Digital Marketing (Full-time/Part-time)
- Web Communication & Information Systems (Part-time)
- Smart Products & Solutions* (Part-time)
- Data Science & Intelligent Analytics (Part-time)

=== Post Graduate ===
The FH Kufstein Tirol Business School offers postgraduate programs. All of the programs are organized in cooperation with industry partners in a part-time format for the convenience of working professionals. The programs support professionals and provide excellent opportunities for academic education and training for future challenging management activities.

Excerpt from the program: Language of Instruction: German, partly English

- Executive Management MBA, Focus Automobile Management
- Executive Management MBA, Focus Facility Management
- Digital Transformation Management
