= Data classification (data management) =

Data classification is the process of organizing data into categories based on attributes like file type, content, or metadata. The data is then assigned class labels that describe a set of attributes for the corresponding data sets. The goal is to provide meaningful class attributes to former less structured information, enabling organizations to manage, protect, and govern their data more effectively.

Data classification can be viewed as a multitude of labels that are used to define the type of data, especially on confidentiality and integrity issues.

== Approaches ==
Classification techniques might be used for reports generated by ERP systems or where the data includes specific personal information that is identified. Many organizations also employ context-based classification that considers factors such as data source, user identity, and application context.

In the US, the National Institute of Standards and Technology provides guidelines for mapping information types to security categories.

== See also ==
- Information security
- Data governance
