= Life cycle thinking =

Awareness of ongoing environmental impact

Life cycle thinking is an approach that emphasizes the assessment and minimization of environmental impacts at all stages of a product's life. This concept seeks to avoid shifting environmental burdens from one stage of the product's life to another. It also recognizes the importance of technological innovation in tackling environmental issues.

Corporations utilize this approach in the creation of environmentally friendly products. Consumers apply it in their mindful choices of products, and governments incorporate it into regulatory frameworks aimed at lessening environmental impacts. This strategy entails pinpointing crucial areas for impact reduction and enhancing consumer awareness regarding environmental concerns.

== Approaches ==
There are many different approaches to life cycle thinking that all involve looking at life cycle-generated impacts and ways to minimize these impacts. An important component is the avoidance of burden shifting, which ensures that improvements in one stage are not achieved at the expense of another stage. Impact measurement focuses on decreasing environmental impact and resource use throughout all stages of a process.

=== Life-cycle assessment ===
Life-cycle assessment (LCA or life cycle analysis) is a technique used to assess potential environmental impacts of a product at different stages of its life. This technique takes a "cradle-to-grave" or a "cradle-to-cradle" approach and looks at environmental impacts that occur throughout the lifetime of a product from raw material extraction, manufacturing and processing, distribution, use, repair and maintenance, disposal, and recycling.

=== Life cycle management (LCM) ===
Life cycle management is a business approach to managing the total life cycle of products and services. It follows the life cycle thinking that businesses, through the activities they must perform, have environmental, social, and economic impacts. LCM is used to understand and analyze the life cycle stages of products and services of a business, identify potential economic, social, or environmental risks and opportunities at each stage and create ways to act upon those opportunities and reduce potential risks.

=== Life cycle costing (LCC) ===
Life cycle costing (or life cycle cost analysis) is the total cost analysis of a process or system. This includes costs incurred over the life of the system and is frequently used to find the most cost-effective means for providing goods and services.

=== Design for the Environment ===
DfE Logo

Design for the Environment Program (DfE) was created in 1992 by the United States Environmental Protection Agency and works to prevent pollution and reduce the risks pollution presents to humans and the environment. The main goals of the DfE are to promote green cleaning, recognize safer industrial and consumer products through safer product labeling, define best practices in production and manufacturing, and identify safer chemicals for these processes based on life cycle thinking.

=== Product service system ===
Product service systems (PSS) are sets of marketable products and services that work together to fulfill a user's needs. This approach is a result of firms realizing that services in combination with products can provide higher profits and customer satisfaction than simply selling products alone. Firms that use PSS work to find ways to maximize the use of their product throughout its lifetime, using services to supplement its usage. PSS has been seen to have a smaller environmental impact than traditional business models, as the focus on services has led to a decrease in material production and consumption. This applies to life cycle thinking because it involves looking at the life-cycle cost of a product (i.e. maintenance and storage costs) for a consumer and reducing that cost by providing services with the purchased good.

=== Integrated product policy (IPP) ===
Integrated product policy works to minimize environmental degradation caused by products by looking at all phases of a product's life cycle to pinpoint where taking action is most effective. This also uses a cradle-to-grave approach when looking at a product's life. In addition, it is important that policies avoid burden shifting and do not decrease environmental emissions at one stage of development at the expense of another. Integrated policy measures used to act upon recommendations include economic instruments, substance bans, voluntary agreements, environmental labeling, and product design guidelines; the use of a variety of tools, rather than a single policy measure, is a central feature of an integrated approach.

The European Commission issued a green paper on IPP on 7 February 2001. The European Parliament initially viewed the Commission's proposals as "interesting" but "unsatisfactory", and called for "a more exhaustive and more cohesive policy proposal" to be put forward. The Commission subsequently adopted a Communication on the subject on 18 June 2003, which was sub-titled "Building on Environmental Life-Cycle Thinking". The Communication listed potential roles to be played by several stakeholders: member states, industry, consumer organizations, environmental organizations and consumers.

== Sectors ==
=== Agriculture ===
Life cycle thinking works to reduce the impact of the agriculture and food industry at all stages of food production. Cultural identity, health, lifestyle, and nutrition are addressed to ensure that decreases in emissions and environmental impact do not occur at the expense of consumer well-being.

=== Manufacturing ===
A Product Life Cycle Analysis involves all production and service processes involved in the manufacturing of a product throughout the life cycle. This includes the production of materials needed to make the product. Since the manufacturing sector is a big emitter of pollutants and a user of natural resources, pinpointing areas in which to decrease environmental impact throughout the manufacturing process is a big part of life-cycle thinking.

=== Energy ===
Drastic increases in atmospheric CO_{2} caused by burning fossil fuels have led to the search for alternative energy sources like biofuels and renewable energy sources. To analyze whether or not these alternative sources have overall less environmental impact than conventional energy sources, life-cycle analysis is needed. Life-cycle thinking is an intricate part of finding new energy sources that have an overall smaller impact on the environment.

=== Waste management ===
Life-cycle thinking and analysis can help reduce the negative environmental impacts of waste generation and management. This includes looking at ways to reduce waste production, increase recycling, and dispose of waste in a more environmentally friendly way. This is complicated by differences in benefits and burdens in different geographical regions and the fact that effects usually occur over long periods. Furthermore, the benefits and burdens of different processes can occur in many different forms and can be difficult to identify, quantify and compare.

=== Retail ===
Retail often accounts for a significant portion of economies and thus can have huge implications in terms of environmental impacts. The life cycle of a product in retail would include the complete supply chain of the product, its use, and disposal or end-of-life treatment.

=== Construction ===
There are many uses for life-cycle thinking in construction, especially in terms of construction waste and waste management. Finding better ways to recycle waste and prevent waste are important to reduce the negative environmental impact of the construction industry.

For construction products in Europe, a standardized methodology for building assessment considering Environmental Products Declarations (EPD) has been approved. The main standards are EN 15978 (buildings) and EN 15804 (products).

=== Transport ===
Car life cycle

Finding alternative fuel sources is the biggest challenge to reducing negative environmental impacts in the transportation sector. Biofuels are becoming increasingly popular as an alternative to fossil fuels. Life cycle analysis can provide a fuller picture of the extent alternative fuel sources reduce emissions and overall environmental impact compared to conventional fuels.

=== Services ===
Service industries play a big part in adding environmental burdens, especially in terms of greenhouse gas emissions generated by travel and tourist industries. The service industry is expected to play a larger part in the modern economy as "dematerialization", or the replacement of manufactured goods by services in many firms, plays a bigger role in the economy.

== Applications ==
There are multiple situations to which life cycle thinking can be applied, including the everyday life of consumers, businesses, and government policy. By applying life cycle thinking to multiple aspects of the community, consumers, businesses and governments can have a largely positive aspect on the environment. This is true even if the steps taken to apply life cycle thinking are small.

=== Consumers ===
Consumers regularly make choices regarding products they would like to use, based on needs and different brands available. Due to several factors, the environmental impact of a product purchase may not be a deciding factor when it comes to choosing a product. Consumers may not be aware of the product's energy usage, questionable labor conditions that produced it, hazardous waste from production, impacts on the ecosystem, or pollution of air or water.

Consumers can apply life cycle thinking in multiple different ways with regards to their product choices to reduce their impact on the environment. Many companies provide sustainability reports that consumers can read to educate themselves. By using life cycle thinking, consumers can choose a company with reduced environmental impacts.

Primarily, consumer usage has the largest impact on the environment throughout a product's life. By using life cycle thinking this impact can be reduced. This would require educating consumers to make better choices about product usage. This can come from the companies who provide the goods and services, from non-profit consumer awareness groups or government agencies. Consumer education starts with a self-assessment; for example, consumers can ask themselves what impacts they have while using the product and whether they can pursue more environmentally friendly alternatives. Consumers can educate themselves on how to become more sustainable themselves through life cycle thinking rather than relying on the efforts of companies and the government.

Businesses are responsible for many choices about their services and products each day. By applying life cycle thinking, businesses can recognize the potential impacts of their choices. They consider how each design and manufacturing decision has an effect on the environment and how they can make it more sustainable. Businesses not only take into consideration how the product is made, but also how the product will be used and disposed of by the user. Companies try to have more sustainable products by making products recyclable or reusable. The challenging part is balancing cost and sustainable choices. Life cycle thinking allows them to see the best sustainable options but is limited when it comes to pricing these choices. Life cycle thinking for businesses entails consideration of where to obtain raw material, how to manufacture the material, and transporting, distributing, using, and disposing of the product. By looking at all of these phases businesses make the best choices for themselves and the consumer for a lower impact on the environment.

=== Governments ===
Government plays a key role in life cycle thinking by establishing policies to regulate environmental impacts. By applying life cycle thinking policymakers can set standards that businesses and consumers need to meet. They do so by gathering information as a baseline of the environmental impact and using that to set goals based on knowledge from life cycle thinking. They can also use trends from the supply chains of different businesses they regulate to determine where the biggest influence can be made to majorly reduce the impacts of the businesses. Government sectors can also use life cycle thinking to better educate consumers. Requiring labels on products describing the impacts the product has and how to use the products to reduce the impact can be an important role for the government. Regulating supply chains and consumers with policy is motivational as negative reinforcement. Life cycle thinking provides a methodology for creating those policies to most effective and cost efficient means of reducing environmental impacts.

== In policy ==
Many consumers, when making decisions on what to buy and what not to buy, consider the environmental impact of the particular product. Policymakers recognize this desire and act to create policy that not only helps consumers do this but will do so while keeping a growing economy in mind.

=== European policy ===
JRC logo

There are many aspects of life cycle thinking incorporated into European policy. The Sustainable Consumption and Production Action Plan is a piece of legislation that aims to reduce the environmental impact and consumption of resources associated with the complete life cycles of goods and services. On July 16, 2008, the European Commission presented this legislation. This proposal suggests plans on how to not only reduce the environmental impacts of goods and services but also encourage the use of more sustainable goods and production technologies. This action plan also encourages the European Union to seek out every opportunity to innovate in the industry.

The Integrated Product Policy is another legislative action that Europe has taken to facilitate life cycle thinking. The Integrated Product Policy seeks to minimize the environmental degradation caused by the manufacturing, use, and disposal of all products. This legislation looks at all aspects of the product's life cycle and takes action where necessary to reduce.

The Thematic Strategy on Sustainable Use of Natural Resources was implemented on 21 December 2005 to reduce environmental impacts associated with resource use and to do this in a growing economy. The objective can be described as "ensuring that the consumption of resources and their associated impacts do not exceed the carrying capacity of the environment and breaking linkages between economic growth and resource use".

=== United States policy ===
While the term "life cycle thinking" is not as prominent in United States policy, there are considerations of the life cycle process throughout governmental policies and programs. There are Environmental Product Declarations that are used to incorporate life cycle thinking into companies and organizations. They communicate to the consumer the environmental performance of a product or system. These declarations are based on the Life Cycle Assessment and once the assessment is complete a product or system can be certified EPD.

The Environmental Protection Agency's program, Design for the Environment works with individual industry sectors to compare and improve the performance and human health and environmental risks and costs of existing and alternative products, processes, and practices. DfE partnership projects promote integrating cleaner, cheaper, and smarter solutions into everyday business practices. The Design for the Environment program is also equipped with a labeling program. They allow safer products to carry these labels and they are an indication to consumers that buying these products will be safer for the environment and their families.

Also, the Energy Independence and Security Act of 2007 is a piece of legislation that incorporates life cycle thinking. While this exact phrase isn't listed. This act includes sections on advanced biofuels. In Title II of the act, it requires the creation of Biomass-based diesel which is the addition of renewable biofuels to diesel fuel and will reduce emissions by 50% as compared to petroleum biofuel. In Title III improved standards will be implemented.

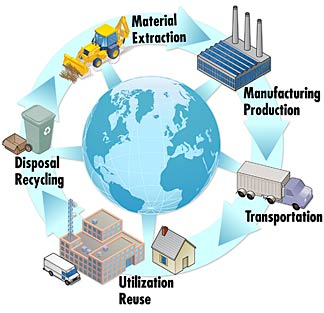
Life Cycle Thinking Product System

== Importance ==
Since life cycle thinking can be involved in the choices of individual consumers, as well as policymakers and businesses, people must be well-informed about the subject and its uses. Increasing awareness of the Life Cycle Analysis technique could allow companies as well as individuals to consider multiple options for a new product. After consideration of all available options, life cycle thinking would encourage the selection of the most sustainable option. If more individuals practiced life cycle thinking when looking for new materials or methods, they would be more aware of how the environmental cost of ownership of products can be influenced by the running costs of energy and consumables.

Life cycle thinking can help people find new ways to improve environmental performance, image, and economic benefits. Since the decisions of global businesses and government organizations have such a large impact on the environment, incorporating life cycle thinking into their actions could greatly reduce negative environmental effects and improve sustainability. Many businesses do not always consider their supply chains or the "end-of-life" processes associated with their products; likewise, government actions frequently consider their own country or region and do not take into account the impact that they could have on other regions.

Not only could life cycle thinking help the environment, but it can also save the company more money and improve its reputation. If a company knows where its materials come from as well as where they will end up after they have reached the end of their useful life, economic performance could be further enhanced. Also, since presently so much emphasis is placed on sustainable actions, the more a company shows its concern and respect for the environment, the better its reputation will be.

In a case study on laundry detergents, it was found that washing clothes at lower temperatures resulted in energy savings and improvements in several environmental indicators, like climate change, acidification, and photochemical ozone creation. Because the company understood the importance of life cycle thinking, they decided to conduct a Life Cycle Analysis to find the benefits of developing a different laundry detergent. Not only did the new detergents reduce environmental impact by decreasing energy consumption, but they also benefited the consumer by reducing electricity bills and helped the company by becoming a leader in the industry. (3)

== See also ==
- Government by algorithm
- Appropriate technology
- Circular economy
- Downcycling
- Durable good
- Industrial ecology
- List of environmental topics
- Loop analysis
- Path analysis
- Regenerative design
- Resource efficiency
- Sharing economy
- Social metabolism
- Sustainability
- Sustainable development
- The Blue Economy
- Upcycling
- Waste & Resources Action Programme
