= Dematerialization (products) =

Reduction of material used in products

The dematerialization of a product literally means less, or better yet, no material is used to deliver the same level of functionality to the user. Sharing, borrowing and the organization of group services that facilitate and cater for communities needs could alleviate the requirement of ownership of many products.

In his book In The Bubble: Designing In A Complex World, John Thakara states that "the average consumer power tool is used for ten minutes in its entire life—but it takes hundreds of times its own weight to manufacture such an object". A product service system with shared tools could simply offer access to them when needed. This shift from a reliance on products to services is the process of dematerialization. Digital music distribution systems, car clubs, bike hire schemes and laundry services all can be examples of dematerialization.
