= Luke Georghiou =

British academic

Luke Georghiou OBE
- Born: 1955 (age 70–71)

Academic work
- Main interests: Innovation policy

Luke Gregory Georghiou OBE (born 1955) is Deputy President and Deputy Vice-Chancellor at the University of Manchester. He is also professor of science and technology policy and management at the Manchester Institute of Innovation Research at Manchester Business School.

== Areas of Interest ==
Georghiou is active in research and policy advice in the fields of research and innovation policy, foresight, and evaluation. He has advocated greater use of demand-side innovation policies, notably public procurement, to stimulate innovation and the alignment of research and innovation systems to address "grand challenges" such as sustainability, food and energy security and the aging society.

In 2011 he was elected to the Academia Europaea and from 2016 chairs the European Universities Association Council for Doctoral Education representing universities in 47 countries. He was co-champion of the 2016 EuroScience Open Forum (ESOF), Europe's largest pan-disciplinary science conference. He is a director of Manchester Science Partnerships and UMI3, the university's technology transfer and intellectual property company.

== Selected publications ==
- Post-Innovation Performance - Technological Development and Competition (MacMillan 1986)
- Evaluation of Research (OECD, Paris 1986)
- Evaluation of the Alvey Programme (HMSO, London 1991)
- The UK Technology Foresight Programme" Futures Vol.28 No.4, pp359–377, 1996
- Equipping Researchers for the Future" Nature Vol.383 pp663–664, October 1996
- Georghiou L and Roessner JD, "Evaluating Technology Programs: Tools and Methods", Research Policy Vol.29 Nos.4–5 April 2000 657–677,
- Georghiou L, "Socio-economic effects of collaborative R&D - European Experiences", April 1999, Journal of Technology Transfer Vol 24 pp69-
- Coombs R and Georghiou L "A new "Industrial Ecology" " Science Vol 296 19 April 2002 471
- Creating an Innovative Europe–report of the Aho group
- Georghiou L, Demanding Innovation: lead markets, public procurement and innovation, NESTA Provocation 02: February 2007, London NESTA
- Georghiou L, Europe's research system must change, Nature Vol 452/24 April 2008
- The Handbook of Technology Foresight - Concepts and Practice, Georghiou L, Cassingena Harper J, Keenan M, Miles I, and Popper R (eds), Edward Elgar (April 2008)
- Public procurement and innovation—Resurrecting the demand side, Edler J. and Georghiou L., 'Research Policy' 36 (2007) 949–963

Professional and academic associations
Preceded by Paul K. Berry	President of the Manchester Statistical Society; 2003–05	Succeeded by Brenda E. Ilett
