= Know-how trading =

Trading knowledge or experience for a fee

Know-how trading is a web-based research and design phenomenon related to open innovation and crowdsourcing. It denotes fee-based knowledge markets that treat knowledge and expertise as commodities that can be traded for financial gain (see knowledge economy). It therefore differs from other information markets such as Yahoo! Answers in that solution providers are financially rewarded for their efforts. The challenges set therefore tend to be more focused, and solutions more detailed and lengthy.

Know-how trading sites differ from open innovation communities in that the entry level for solutions is much lower. Rather than seeking large research projects, know-how trading enables businessmen, researchers and individuals to save time by harnessing the skills and expertise of others to solve very specific, often quite difficult problems. Some individuals use know-how trading portals in an informal way to accumulate new knowledge about subjects which they are interested in.

Generally, any individual can sign up for a know-how trading portal for free and browse the selection of questions and challenges by reward and subject. Because reward is only transferred upon successful completion of the project, anyone can submit solutions without prior qualification.

Examples of know-how trading portals include innocentive, NineSigma and Starmind. Innovation communities such as Experts-Exchange and Mahalo Answers work on a similar business model but paying rewards in an artificial currency.

== See also ==
- Competitive intelligence – Collection and analysis of business and market information from multiple sources
- Crowdsourcing – Sourcing services or funds from a group
- Digital economy – Economy based on digital computing technologies
- Electronic business – Business that takes place over the internet
- Information economy – Economy where information is valued as a capital good
- Information market – type of market
- Knowledge economy – Approach to generating value
- Knowledge management – Processing of knowledge to accomplish organizational goals
- Knowledge market – Mechanism for distributing knowledge resources
- Knowledge organization – Field of study related to Library and Information Science
- Private intelligence agency
