= Product-service system =

Business model

Product-service systems (PSS) are business models that provide for cohesive delivery of products and services. PSS models are emerging as a means to enable collaborative consumption of both products and services, with the aim of pro-environmental outcomes.

== Description ==
Product service systems are when a firm offers a mix of both products and services, in comparison to the traditional focus on products. As defined by van Halen, te Riele, Goedkoop "a marketable set of products and services capable of jointly fulfilling a user's needs", PSS can be realized by smart products.

The Product-Service System (PSS) concept was first developed at the Politecnico di Milano between 1993 and 1996 by Francesco Mauri and Gianluca Brugnoli while they were studying how Design integrates with business strategy. Up to that point, companies usually handled products, services, communication and distribution as separate activities, managed by separate functions. The idea behind a PSS is that companies should combine and orchestrate all of these parts, into one coordinated, consistent, and distinct 'system' so they can compete more effectively and establish better customer interactions.

The initial move to PSS was largely motivated by the rise in the 90s of the service economy in saturated markets, and the need of traditional manufacturing firms to cope with changing market forces and the recognition that services in combination with products could provide a more competitive strategy and higher profits than products alone. Faced with shrinking markets and increased commoditization of their products, these firms saw service provision as a new path towards profits and growth.

While not all product service systems result in the reduction of material consumption, they are more widely being recognized as an important part of a firm's environmental strategy. In fact, some researchers have redefined PSS as necessarily including improved environmental improvement. For example, Mont defines PSS as "a system of products, services, supporting networks, and infrastructure that is designed to be competitive, satisfy customers' needs, and have a lower environmental impact than traditional business models." Mont elaborates on her definition as follows: A PSS is a pre-designed system of products, services, supporting infrastructures, and necessary networks that is a so-called dematerialized solution to consumer preferences and needs. It has also been defined as a "self-learning" system, one of whose goals is continual improvement.

This view of PSS is similar to other concepts commonly seen in the environmental management literature, such as "dematerialization" and "servicizing".

PSS has been used to create value for customers beyond selling products as simple functions. Typically, there are four approaches to PSS design.

- Function-based PSS: add new functions to increase product value in the competing market. For example, General Motors added OnStar in 1992 to product emergency services for customers. It integrated GPS with vehicle sensory system for telematics-based on-demand services.
- Value-added PSS: companies added new features to increase value of a product to expand its value to customers and users. For example, Otis Elevator added Remote Elevator Maintenance (REM) system to its fleet system to monitor their elevators to reduce failures. GE Healthcare (formerly GE Medical Systems) developed InSite to remotely monitor its medical equipment in order to reduce service costs and increase users' benefits.
- Evidence-based Service: companies use big data analytics to provide the actual saving and further develop a service contract for customer to pay for part of the savings.

There are many methodologies on PSS design. Dominant Innovation system uses an Innovation Matrix to identify gaps from customer's fear, not needs based on scenario-based path finding. A new value-chain ecosystem can be further developed to link these gaps between two invisible spaces. For example, John Deere developed Agric Service business based on the customers' worries on soil related issues. It integrates sensors with GPS to develop cognitive site map about soil content to optimize crop yields. Several peer-reviewed scientific articles have reviewed and give an overview of the PSS design research field.

In recent years, PSS has been further integrated with big data analytics for accelerated innovation. Other technologies such as prognostics, health management and cyber-physical systems have further created service innovation technologies for PSS. For example, Alstom has been developing Train Tracer technologies since 2006 and is implementing Health Hub system for its transport fleets.

=== Product Servitization ===
"Product Servitization" is a transaction through which value is provided by a combination of products and services in which the satisfaction of customer needs is achieved either by selling the function of the product rather than the product itself, by increasing the service component of a product offer, or by selling the output generated by the product. The concept is based on the idea that what customers want from products is not necessarily ownership, but rather the function that the product provides or the service the product can deliver. This means that the provider of "servicizing solutions" may get paid by the unit-of-service (or product function) delivered, as opposed to the (more traditional) unit-of-products sold. See service economy for more on product servitization.

==== Types ====
One type of product servitization solution is based on transactions where payment is made—not for the "product"—but for the "product-service package" (part of PSS) which has been sold to the customer. This servicized purchase extends the buying transaction from a one-time sale (product acquisition), to a long-term service relationship (such as in the case of a long-term maintenance-free service contract).

Another type of servicizing may be a strategy for providing access to services for people who cannot afford to buy products outright. For example, in the case where auto ownership is economically unfeasible, creative servicizing offers at least three possible solutions: one in which transportation can be achieved simultaneously (as in car-pooling); one in which transportation can be achieved sequentially (as in car-sharing); and one in which transportation can be achieved eventually (rent-to-own).

== Types ==
There are various issues in the nomenclature of the discussion of PSS, not least that services are products, and need material products in order to support delivery, however, it has been a major focus of research for several years. The research has focussed on a PSS as system comprising tangibles (the products) and intangibles (the services) in combination for fulfilling specific customer needs. The research has shown that manufacturing firms are more amenable to producing "results", rather than solely products as specific artefacts, and that consumers are more amenable to consuming such results. This research has identified three classes of PSS:

- Product Oriented PSS: This is a PSS where ownership of the tangible product is transferred to the consumer, but additional services, such as maintenance contracts, are provided.
- Use Oriented PSS: This is a PSS where ownership of the tangible product is retained by the service provider, who sells the functions of the product, via modified distribution and payment systems, such as sharing, pooling, and leasing.
- Result Oriented PSS: This is a PSS where products are replaced by services, such as, for example, voicemail replacing answering machines.

This typology has been criticized for failing to capture the complexity of PSS examples found in practice. Aas et al. for example proposed a typology with eight categories relevant in the digital era, whereas Van Ostaeyen et al. proposed an alternative that categorizes PSS types according to two distinguishing features: the performance orientation of the dominant revenue mechanism and the degree of integration between product and service elements. According to the first distinguishing feature, a PSS can be designated as input-based (IB), availability-based (AB), usage-based (UB) or performance-based (PB). The performance-based type can be further subdivided into three subtypes:

- Solution oriented (PB-SO) PSS: (e.g. selling a promised level of heat transfer efficiency instead of selling radiators)
- Effect oriented (PB-EO) PSS: (e.g. selling a promised temperature level in a building instead of selling radiators)
- Demand-fulfillment oriented (PB-DO) PSS: (e.g. selling a promised level of thermal comfort for building occupants instead of selling radiators)

According to the second distinguishing feature, a PSS can be designated as segregated, semi-integrated, and integrated, depending on to what extent the product and service elements (e.g. maintenance service, spare parts) are combined into a single offering.

== Examples ==
The following existing offerings illustrate the PSS concept:

- Xerox' pay-per-copy model for selling office equipment
- Atlas Copco's Contract Air service, whereby air compressors are sold per m^{3} of compressed air delivered
- Philips' pay-per-lux model for selling lighting equipment, whereby customers pay for a promised level of illuminance in a building
- Michelin's fleet management solution whereby truck sold per kilometer driven

== Impact ==
Several authors assert that product service systems will improve eco-efficiency by what is termed "factor 4", i.e. an improvement by a factor of 4 times or more, by enabling new and radical ways of transforming what they call the "product-service mix" that satisfy consumer demands while also improving the effects upon the environment.

van Halen et al. state that the knowledge of PSS enables both governments to formulate policy with respect to sustainable production and consumption patterns, and companies to discover directions for business growth, innovation, diversification, and renewal.

Tietze and Hansen discuss the impact of PSS on firms' innovation behavior identifying three determinants. First, product ownership is not transferred to the customers, but remains with the PSS operating firm. Second, the purpose of a product is different if it is used within PSS solutions than compared to the purpose of products in classical transaction based business models. When offering PSS, products are used as a means for offering a service. Third, the profit function of PSS operating firms differs substantially from profit functions of firms that develop, manufacture and sell their products.

From a manufacturer's perspective, the business potential of a PSS is determined by an interplay of four mechanisms: cost reduction, increased customer value, changes to the company's competitive environment and an expansion of the customer base.

== See also ==
- Extended producer responsibility
- Life cycle thinking
- Performance-based contracting
- Product stewardship
- as a service
