= Learning society =

Educational philosophy

Learning society is an educational philosophy advocated by the OECD and UNESCO that positions education as the key to a nation’s economic development, and holds that education should extend beyond formal learning (based in traditional educational institutions – schools, universities etc.) into informal learning centres to support a knowledge economy (known as a “world education culture”).

A learning society regards the actual process of learning as an ‘activity, not a place’ – that is, it takes place outside of regular educational institutions, and is thus also decentralised and deregulated, a tenet of globalisation theory.

Learning societies are broader in context, drawing on elements of systems to facilitate the ability for lifelong learning in the individual. If lifelong learning is about the ability of the individual, then this is enabled through a Learning Society.

It is the ‘socialisation’ of individual lifelong learning, and is currently aided through technologies and the increasing focus on social networking, by using the shared learning experiences of individuals as a basis for a larger network of education that exists formally and informally (schools, universities, job-training, support, collaboration, feedback etc.).

== History and theoretical framework ==
The history of the concept of the learning society can be traced through the chronological development of its theoretical framework. As the framework has developed overtime, so has the sophistication of the idea of the learning society as it applies to an inter-connected 21st-century model, particularly in relation to the shift from state-based educational institutions to more decentralised organisations.

In 1973, Donald Schön developed the idea that change is constant in a modern state (‘loss of the stable state’) and thus to adapt to this change, there must be a constant state of learning within the society of that state. Further, Robert Maynard Hutchins also argued that given the ever-changing nature of states, particularly in business organisations, it wasn’t possible for educational institutions to keep up, or even be expected to. Later, Torsten Husén and Stewart Ranson emphasise that learning has a certain ‘fluidity’ (with no start or end points) that exists outside of formal systems and this seems to reflect a liberalised market model of free movements of knowledge as required by organisations and systems.

Developing this framework to a more contemporary basis, it is seen that the requirement for a ‘learning society’ is a response to the broader issues of globalisation whereby richer countries have then become increasingly dependent on “knowledge workers” rather than traditional manufacturing industries (now often outsourced to developing nations), and thus need their workforces to become adaptable, particularly in light of new technological developments which are seen as central to the knowledge economy. With this model the concept of the learning society will be transplanted to other countries globally, much like any other product on a global market. This is in keeping with the philosophy of the World Bank that learning and education is central to improved development, justice, the environment and eradication of poverty (and thus global terror threats).

== Relationship to lifelong learning ==
A learning society is generally considered to be the basis from which lifelong learning can take place. From a theoretical standpoint, not only does the learning society provide the framework in which lifelong learning is allowed to flourish, but that in fact both elements mutually support each other. That is, a learning society gives rise to the capacity for lifelong learning, but lifelong learning allows, through socialisation, for individuals to contribute back to the learning abilities of broader society in the form of wisdom (known as a ‘koinosophic’ or ‘wise’ society).

== Elements of learning societies ==
While the notion of the learning society can be sometimes difficult to grasp (relying as it does on concepts such as ‘fluidity’ and ‘informality’, and moving outside of traditional educative boundaries such as schools & universities), some scholars believe that a learning society can be identified as having 4 main attributes. These are:

=== Futuristic ===
This is described as the tendency of the learning society to have a dependency on technological advances. This can be regarded as the shifts towards knowledge economies in developed countries where the concept of the learning society is most prevalent, but also vitally as acknowledging the importance of the internet in allowing education to move beyond traditional boundaries and move across transnational borders instantly.

=== Societal ===
This attribute is part of the broader conscious acknowledgement that is made by states and institutions that lifelong learning (as part of the learning society) exists specifically to contribute to the economic growth of a country and increase the democratic engagement of its citizens. Rather than being a general global shift towards an educational trend, it is aims towards specific outcomes that societies consider to be for their betterment.

=== Reflexive ===
This attribute requires learning societies to recognise not just the role of lifelong learning within the broader community, but also to enable it to be adaptable to changes, and flexible to specific individual needs. These changes may come about as a result of technological advances, legislative amendments or personal preferences of the individual undertaking the education. According to Jarvis: (italics)(indent) “...education will be but one more provider of information in the learning market and the educational qualification will become the public recognition of a private process.” (normal)(no indent) Thus, it will be the awareness of an individual’s ability to learn that will be of value, rather than what that individual has learned in the past.

=== Global market ===
The final attribute of a learning society requires that, like many products on a global market, education becomes a commodity and that students or participants in the learning process become consumers, able to pick and choose the types of education that they would like, to suit their own personal preferences. This would be facilitated through technological advances that allow students to access learning resources (and qualifications) globally. Under this attribute, education would then become tailored towards providing “customer satisfaction” to become economically justifiable.

== Current models of learning societies today ==
=== Australia and UK ===
One of the most prevalent examples is the model of the Open Universities, common in the UK and Australia. They allow students to work towards qualifications accredited by existing higher educational institutions but ‘cherry-pick’ the courses they have a preference for, while at the same time conducting their learning online. This is best typified by a testimonial found on the Open Universities Australia website:

“Studying through OUA is very rewarding, particularly if you are a motivated and patient person. It also offers the flexibility that you simply can’t get with a brick-and-mortar university, which is definitely beneficial for some." – Open Universities Australia testimonial

=== China ===
In 1993, China aimed by the year 2000 to increase to 4% of GDP its spending on education in an effort to move the Chinese population towards being a learning society. It did not meet this target, but in 2009 resolved to meet the same goal by 2020 (which would total some US$200 billion in investment). This proposed investment would address reforms such as:

- Increase private-public sector partnerships in pre-schools
- Increase global stature of universities and higher education institutions
- Improve education standards in rural areas
- Develop non-formal education facilities to allow for lifelong learning (i.e. distance learning, network building)
- Reform of nationwide examination programs
- Digitise learning processes through technology

=== United States ===
On the United States Department of Education website there is very little reference to the concept of the learning society. What does exist consists of Taiwan's EduCity of networked schools and classrooms in the National Education Technology Plan 2010

=== Other ===
The concept of lifelong learning (as facilitated by a learning society) would allow for higher education to be undertaken at any stage of the students life (perhaps even on more than one occasion) rather than at the traditional undergraduate stage.

Based very much in the “world education culture” model”, learning societies are seen as being central to competitive knowledge economy in a globalised world. Advocates of learning societies see traditional institutions as no longer being central to lifelong learning. For example, transnational corporations such as Cisco believe that it will not come about simply through building more schools and universities. These organisations also advocate for the role of lifelong learning within their own structures.

== Debates regarding learning societies & higher education ==
Debates are argued addressing the role of how existing higher education institutions fit into the concept of the learning society. Despite the traditional argument that the learning society eschews traditional institutions, some advocates of the concept reaffirm the role of universities as being central to where the learning society begins and argue that “the university’s role in society is precisely to learn and understand itself and its environment...The more it addresses the concerns of society in its research, and the more it widens access to all members of society to benefit from the fruits of the research, the more it supports a genuine ‘learning society’”

In September 2010, newly elected Australian Prime Minister Julia Gillard reflected the growing diversification of the education sector in her cabinet, by abandoning the role of a traditional ‘Education Minister’ and instead subsuming the role of higher education into a ministerial portfolio that also included jobs, skills and workplace relations – this move was criticised by many high-profile universities in Australia who argued that it undermined the central role of higher education as a place for learning in society.

Further, advocates of the ‘Learning Society’ also call upon partnerships between public and private enterprises to expand the scope of education to allow for more powerful educational learning experiences inside and outside of traditional institutions. These partnerships are seen to increase supplement funding levels (where inadequate public funds exists) as well as open traditional institutions and methods to technology and industry”.

One criticism is that the learning society does not actually exist, but is simply a tool or theory invoked by powers (governments, IGO’s) to push certain agendas. This argument maintains that it is easy to see how the idea could be used to justify World Bank & OECD programs in developing countries Or rather that it is nothing more than a vague term to describe an unfocused notion of 'learning on the internet'

It is often difficult to find, despite the prevalence of the term ‘learning society’ amongst policy makers and politicians, information of real strategic funding from governments or corporations that reflect the theories and approaches of the learning society.

With regard to questions being asked of the concept of the learning society, beyond ‘on-the-job’ training corporations may speak of the value of learning, but could it simply be another term for ‘flexibility’ on the part of employees? Is the term simply a term used to define current (yet inevitable) changes in education technology in an increasingly connected world? In the case of China's proposed improvements to their education system, it could be argued that much of the reforms are simply a timeline of general educational upgrades, rather than adhering to any particular philosophy unique to a 'learning society'.

Further, a lack of specificity can exist in much of the literature surrounding the learning society. For example, the Cisco white paper speaks of:

"...21st Century skills like collaboration, problem-solving and creativity..."

but how these particular skills are unique to the idea of a learning society (as opposed to learning generally) is not clear.

Further, there is criticism that standardisation of assessment and credentialing ignores the cultural differences between global communities, and thus erodes important distinctions that may allow learning and education to be effectively embedded in those cultures”.

== See also ==
- Higher education
- Neoliberalism
- Lifelong learning
- Formal education
