= Smart product =

Smart products are specializations of hybrid products with physical realizations of product categories and digital product descriptions that provide the following characteristics:

- Situated: recognition and processing of situational and community contexts
- Personalized: tailoring to buyer's and consumer's needs and affects
- Adaptive: change according to buyer's and consumer's responses and tasks
- Pro-active: attempt to anticipate buyer's and consumer's plans and intentions
- Business aware: considering business and legal constraints
- Location aware: considering functional performing and restricted location choice
- Network capable: ability to communicate and bundle (product bundling) with another product (business) or product sets

The vision of smart products poses questions relevant to various research areas, including marketing, product engineering, computer science, artificial intelligence, economics, communication science, media economics, cognitive science, consumer psychology, innovation management and many more.

Since smart products combine a physical product with additional services, they are a form of product service system.

== History ==
Recent innovations in mobile and sensor technologies allow for creating a digital representation of almost any physical entity and its parameters over time at any place. RFID technologies, for instance, are used to ground digital representations, which are used to track and geo-reference physical entities. In general, physical worlds and digital representations become tightly interconnected, so that manipulations in either would have effect on the other.

Integration of information and communication technologies into products anywhere and anytime enable new forms of mobile marketing in respect to situated marketing communication, dynamic pricing models and dynamic product differentiation models. As Fano and Gershman state: "Technology enables service providers to make the location of their customers the location of their business".

== Categories of smart products ==
The term smart product can be confusing as it is used to cover a broad range of different products, ranging from smart home appliances (e.g., smart bathroom scales or smart light bulbs) to smart cars (e.g., Tesla). While these products share certain similarities, they often differ substantially in their capabilities. Raff et al. developed a conceptual framework that distinguishes different smart products based on their capabilities, which features 4 types of smart product archetypes (in ascending order of "smartness")

- Digital
- Connected
- Responsive
- Intelligent

== See also ==
- Ambient intelligence
- Smart, connected products
- Ubiquitous computing
