= Knowledge value =

The idea that knowledge has value is ancient. In the 1st century AD, Juvenal (55-130) stated “All wish to know but none wish to pay the price". In 1775, Samuel Johnson wrote: “All knowledge is of itself of some value.”

In the 19th century, Coleridge (1825) stated that : “The worth and value of knowledge is in proportion to the worth and value of its object.” Auerbach (1865) asked: “What is all our knowledge worth?" although he proposed no answer. Largely the same ideas are already expressed in the term intellectual capital or the more ancient knowledge is power - given that power is a value in its own right.

Only towards of the end of the 20th century, however, was the value of knowledge in a business context generally recognized. The idea has since become something of a management fad, although many authors indicate that the underlying principles will become standard business practice. It is now understood that knowledge about how to produce products and provide services as well as their embedded knowledge is often more valuable than the products and services themselves or the materials they contain. Although measuring the value of knowledge remains elusive, describing its flow through value chains is a step in the right direction.

Firestone was the first to relate knowledge to business when he noted that “Thought, not money is the real business capital.” Alvin Toffler (1990) proposed that knowledge is a wealth and force multiplier, in that it augments what is available or reduces the amount needed to achieve a given purpose.

In comparing knowledge and product value, Amidon (1997) observes that knowledge about how to produce products may be more valuable than the products themselves. Leonard similarly points out that products are physical manifestations of knowledge and that their worth depends largely on the value of the embedded knowledge.

Davis (1999) further notes that the computer chips in a high-end automobile are worth more than the steel, plastics, glass, or rubber. However, Davis and Botin (1994) indicate that awareness of the value of knowledge exceeds the ability of many businesses to extract it from the goods and services in which it is embedded.

Measuring the value of knowledge has not progressed much beyond an awareness that traditional accounting practices are misleading and can lead to wrong business decisions (Martin, 1996). Amidon (1997) points out that the shift from tangible to intangible assets will revolutionize the way that enterprises are measured and that there is an entirely new way to value economic wealth.

Simard et al. (2007) developed a content value chain describing the flow of content through a sequence of stages in which its form is changed and its value or utility to users are notably increased at each stage: objects, data, information, knowledge, and wisdom. They also developed a knowledge services value chain, which describes the flow of knowledge services through a sequence of stages, in which value is embedded, advanced, or extracted.

The stages are: generate, transform, manage, use internally, transfer, add value, use professionally, use personally, and evaluate.

== See also ==
- Content
- Explicit knowledge
- Tacit knowledge
- Knowledge economy
- Knowledge market
- Knowledge organization
- Knowledge Revolution
- Knowledge workers
