= Network economy =

The network economy is the emerging economic order within the information society. The name stems from a key attribute - products and services are created and value is added through social networks operating on large or global scales. This is in sharp contrast to industrial-era economies, in which ownership of physical or intellectual property stems from its development by a single enterprise. Business models for capturing ownership rights for value embedded in products and services created by social networks are being explored.

== Network economy ==
The network economy may be viewed from a number of perspectives: transition from the industrial economy, digital and information infrastructure, global scale, value networks, and intellectual property rights.

From a transitional point of view, Malone and Laubacher (1998) indicate that the Information Revolution has changed the nature of business activity. Because information can be shared instantly and inexpensively on a global scale, the value of centralized decision making and expensive bureaucracies is greatly diminished. Brand (1999) points out that commerce is being accelerated by the digital and network revolutions and that the role of commerce is to both exploit and absorb these shocks. Some effort must focus on developing new infrastructure while other activity will emphasize governance and evolving culture. Rifkin (2000) notes that real estate has become a business burden in network-based markets.

From an infrastructure perspective, Tapscott (1996) compares information networks of the new economy to highways and the power grid of the industrial economy. He suggests that no country can succeed without state-of-the-art electronic infrastructure. Schwartz (1999) writes that in the future, large companies will manage their purchasing, invoicing, document exchange, and logistics through global networks that connect a billion computing devices.

At global scales, Tapscott (1996) indicates that companies can provide 24-hour service as customer requests are transferred from one time zone to another without customers being aware that the work is being done on the other side of the world. Boyett and Boyett (2001) point out that the larger the network, the greater its value and desirability. In a networked economy, success begets more success.

Kelly (1998) states that in a network economy, value is created and shared by all members of a network rather than by individual companies and that economies of scale stem from the size of the network - not the enterprise. Similarly, because value flows from connectivity, Boyett and Boyett (2001) point out that an open system is preferable to a closed system because the former typically have more nodes. They also indicate that such networks are blurring the boundaries between a company and its environment.

To better explain productivity incentives, Yochai Benkler notes that value measures for social production must take both extrinsic (e.g. monetary) and intrinsic (e.g., personal satisfaction) rewards into account, with the latter carrying greater emphasis in the network economy. Quoting Barton Beebe, Gabriella Coleman suggests that work within the network economy speaks to “the utopian promise of unalienated labor, of human flourishing through creative and self-actualizing production.”

A network economy raises important issues with respect to intellectual property. Shapiro and Varian (1999) explain that once a first copy of information has been produced, producing additional copies costs virtually nothing. Rifkin (2000) proposes that as markets make way for networks, ownership is being replaced by access rights because ownership becomes increasingly marginal to business success and economic progress.

Notable examples of the network economy model include the arms trafficking and the illegal drug trade. Merchants participating in those markets cannot openly advertise their wares and participate in the open market since that would attract the attention of law enforcement agencies. Instead they have to rely on a network of people they are familiar with be it friends, relatives or fellow gang members. However, illicit trade dynamics have recently shifted towards an open market model due to the emergence of Darknet markets where merchants and buyers can easily communicate and post detailed product reviews and descriptions while staying anonymous.

== See also ==
- Digital revolution
- Digital economy
- Electronic business
- Electronic commerce
- Information economy
- Information highway
- Information market
- Information Revolution
- Information society
- Intellectual property
- Internet economy
- Knowledge economy
- Knowledge market
- Network effect
- Networked information economy
- Social networking
- Social peer-to-peer processes
- Virtual economy
