= Knowledge value chain =

A knowledge value chain is a sequence of intellectual tasks by which knowledge workers build their employer's unique competitive advantage and/or social and environmental benefit. As an example, the components of a research and development project form a knowledge value chain.

Productivity improvements in a knowledge value chain may come from knowledge integration in its original sense of data systems consolidation. Improvements also flow from the knowledge integration that occurs when knowledge management techniques are applied to the continuous improvement of a business process or processes.

The term first started coming into common use around 1999, appearing in management-related talks and papers. It was registered as a trademark in 2004 by TW Powell Co., a Manhattan company.

Knowledge value chain processes

- Knowledge acquisition
- Knowledge storage
- Knowledge dissemination
- Knowledge application
