= Information market =

Digital information sold and distributed via networks

Although information has been bought and sold since ancient times, the idea of an information marketplace is relatively recent. The nature of such markets is still evolving, which complicates development of sustainable business models. However, certain attributes of information markets are beginning to be understood, such as diminished participation costs, opportunities for customization, shifting customer relations, and a need for order.

== Overview ==
In describing the idea of information markets, Mcgee and Prusak (1993) note that people barter for information, use it as an instrument of power, or trade it for information of greater value. In contrast, Shapiro and Varian (1999) point out that historical leaders in information markets, such as newspapers and encyclopedias are at risk of losing their positions as new technology greatly reduces the cost of creating and distributing information. They also indicate that information markets will not resemble textbook competitive markets with many suppliers offering similar products but lacking the ability to influence prices.

In describing the transition from traditional to information markets, Simard (2005) used a metaphor of autonomous providers and users exchanging information in place of sellers and buyers trading goods and services, respectively. Martin (1996) indicates that as manufacturing shifts from mass production to customization, marketing should shift to individualization. Similarly, Mcgee and Prusak (1993) state that with the increased capacity for customization, information about products and services will become an increasingly important resource.

Hagel and Rayport (1997) focus on customer relations. Although businesses assume that information about customers is freely available for the taking, as customers assume greater control of this information, access will likely become more difficult. Further, as ownership of information shifts to the customer, a new source of supply is created and there may be opportunities for intermediaries to add value by linking this supply with business demand.

Although Web-enabled information markets resemble the frontier-style "old west", Sparr (2001) states that governments will eventually find ways to step in with standards, property rights, and regulations, as all economic activity ultimately depends on order. This has virtually always been the case in the past and there is no reason to expect that the Net will be different.

For Linde and Stock (2011) the information market is the market for digital information distributed via networks. Traded are all sort of software applications and of content (from blogs via images, films and games up to scientific articles and patents). I-Commerce is the e-commerce with (digital) information.

== Definition and scope ==
An information marketplace is a market or platform in which information-based goods, such as digital content, software, datasets, research outputs, or other data products, are exchanged, licensed, or monetised through digital networks. Unlike many physical goods, information goods can often be copied and distributed at low marginal cost, which affects pricing, access control, and business models.

Contemporary information marketplaces include commercial data marketplaces, digital content platforms, software distribution services, and specialised markets for data products. In data marketplaces, data owners, brokers, and users may interact through online platforms that support discovery, access, licensing, and pricing of data assets.

== See also ==
- Content (media and publishing) – Methods used to exchange information
- Information economy – Economy where information is valued as a capital good
- Information society – Society driven by the processing and communication of information
- Intellectual property – Ownership of creative expressions and processes
- Internet economy – Economy based on digital computing technologies
- Know-how trading – Trading knowledge or experience for a fee
- Knowledge economy – Approach to generating value
- Knowledge market – Mechanism for distributing knowledge resources
- Market for zero-day exploits – Trafficking of undiscovered software exploits
- Prediction market – Platforms for betting on events
