= Learning economy =

A learning economy is a society that values skills like assets, where learning and employment information is readily exchanged from institution to institution, and controlled by the learner and worker.

== History of knowledge economies ==
Modern economies can be characterised as learning economies in which knowledge is the crucial resource and learning is the most important process. Different kinds of learning and economically relevant types of knowledge can likewise be identified. It is argued that pure market economies, if such existed, would have severe problems in terms of learning and innovation. The 'learning economy' is a mixed economy in a fundamental sense.

In the public debate, knowledge is increasingly presented as the crucial factor in the development of both society and the economy. In a growing number of publications from the European Commission and Organisation for Economic Co-operation and Development it is emphasised that citizens of European Union member countries currently operate in ‘a knowledge-based economy’. For several reasons many prefer the term ‘the learning economy’ in characterising the current phase of socio-economic development.

== Active studies ==
Academic achievements of learning economy using blockchain appeared in April 2018. In 2018 at the annual United Nations General Assembly, a decentralized Learning Economy blockchain protocol was proposed. It asserts that if "education was the new gold standard," a market economy could be built around it to catalyze and incentivize 21st century education. Blockchain has many applications in education including verifying the integrity of skills, returning the control of identity to the students, and defining research provenance. In April 2019, research was published at Harvard Kennedy School making a case for a new form of Economy Corporation (E-Corp) to govern this decentralized Learning Economy.

On January 30, 2020, the state of Colorado's Department of Higher Education and the Learning Economy Foundation partnered to provide a three-year empirical study of a statewide decentralized education and workplace ecosystem as a test case for other states and nations. The C-Lab provides a unified space for Web3 pilots and workgroups from across the state of Colorado. Its first goals are learner record interoperability, allowing learning institutions to exchange student records seamlessly, and learner wallets that empower the students to save their credentials on their phones and share them directly with employers and learning institutions. To further this effort, the Colorado Governor's Office of Information Technology, CDHE, Learning Economy Foundation, and ETH Denver launched the "Advance Colorado” partnership program powered by the State of Colorado to further blockchain technology initiatives. The goal of the consortium is to lay the foundation for a decentralized and open Internet of Education.

== Early criticism ==
Much of the initial theories about the advent of a fundamentally new era in which economic activity is increasingly 'abstract', i.e., disconnected from land, labour, and physical capital (machines and industrial infrastructure) and also capital in terms of fund was associated with the 'business management' literature of the 'new economy' NASDAQ bubble, which collapsed in 2001 (but slowly recovered, albeit, in a leaner format, throughout the 2000s). This literature was initially known more for its hyperbole and faddishness than for its academic/empirical integrity. More recently [2011] however, empirical research from cross-disciplinary fields such as innovation studies are altering that perception.

Since 2017, the case for decentralized blockchain learning economies has grown stronger along with its criticisms. Many distributed applications have tested economic models that incentivize students and teachers, but without institutional and government support there is little chance of many national learning economies adopting at scale any time soon. Another major concern is new and unknown challenges with student privacy and distributed ledgers, as well as skepticism about the merits of cryptocurrency.

== See also ==
- Knowledge economy
