= Technological innovation =

Type of innovation

Technological innovation is an extended concept of innovation. While innovation is a rather well-defined concept, it has a broad meaning to many people, and especially numerous understanding in the academic and business world.

Innovation refers to adding extra steps to developing new services and products in the marketplace or in the public that fulfill unaddressed needs or solve problems that were not in the past. Technological Innovation however focuses on the technological aspects of a product or service rather than covering the entire organization business model. It is important to clarify that Innovation is not only driven by technology, but can also be driven by various other factors, including market demand, social and environmental factors, and process improvements.

== Definition ==
Technological innovation is the process where an organization (or a group of people working outside a structured organization) embarks in a journey where the importance of technology as a source of innovation has been identified as a critical success factor for increased market competitiveness. The wording "technological innovation" is preferred to "technology innovation". "Technology innovation" gives a sense of working on technology for the sake of technology. "Technological innovation" better reflects the business consideration of improving business value by working on technological aspects of the product or services. These advancements would show improvement for the business's that adapt to this new technology. Moreover, in a vast majority of products and services, there is not one unique technology at the heart of the system. It is the combination, integration, and interaction of different technologies that make the product or service successful.

== Process ==
If the process of technological innovation is formalized (typically within an organization: a company, a public body, a think tank, a university, etc.) it can be referred to as technological innovation management (or Technology Innovation Management - TIM). The "management" aspect refers to the inputs, outputs and constraints a "manager" or team of "managers" are responsible to govern the process of technological innovation in a way that aligns with the company strategy. In a context where technological innovation is not to be guided along known paths within the organization, the wording and concept of technological innovation leadership is preferred. On many occasions, especially in start-ups and new ventures, technological innovation is performed in an unknown context. The boundaries and constraints of the technology at work are not precisely known. Hence it requires leaders and not managers to give the vision and coach the team to explore the unknown part of the technology.

== Innovation in businesses ==
Technological innovation will impact prices of stock in companies. This can be due to new inventions in technology which make it easier for jobs to be done in the market. Investors see bigger returns on investments of companies with new technology due to innovations that have changed the market. Although companies that can’t keep up with the pace of change and adapt to disruptive innovation often find themselves floundering. With new innovations being added to companies value this in turn will create an increase in profits of the company thus increasing stock prices for the company.

The stock market is a way that companies can raise money for the company’s production or operations by selling shares of stock in the company. With newly raised money, companies can invest that money into new advancements which will bring more profit's in the future.

Although companies do adopt technological innovations often, some decide to not which leads to major gaps between what is the new "normal" and what used to be "old fashioned". Innovations benefit companies but leave those who do not adapt to them become outpaced. Companies that do not respond to different market changes from innovation, tend to miss out on opportunities which could end up ruining a company.

== Corollary ==
Technological innovation:

- is a continuous process, within an internal or external venture, build-out to create value with innovation;
- starts with the ideation process and ends up with the commercialization of a viable product or service, in response to a proven market need;
- is a guide for the venture management to decide what technology directions to take, based on portfolio management, and execution monitoring;
- is driven by entrepreneurial/intrapreneurial spirit, supported by internal/external funding
- fosters collaboration, perspectives, and resources to fuel creativity, problem-solving, and breakthrough discoveries.
- allows for businesses to further invest in themselves which presents growth in businesses.
- is not solely driven by technological advancements but also by the interplay of economic, political, environmental, and ethical considerations.
- entails changes in social and political life as a result. Pope Francis, in his 2015 encyclical letter, Laudato si', asks
  How can a society plan and protect its future amid constantly developing technological innovations?

His answer is that laws must regulate innovation and social relationships at national and local levels: "individual states can no longer ignore their responsibility for planning, coordination, oversight and enforcement within their respective borders. ... One authoritative source of oversight and coordination is the law, which lays down rules for admissible conduct in the light of the common good.
