= Knowledge economy =

Approach to generating value

The knowledge economy, or knowledge-based economy, is an economic system in which the production of goods and services is primarily driven by knowledge-intensive activities that contribute to the advancement of technical and scientific innovation. The key element of value in this paradigm lies in the increased reliance on human capital and intellectual property as primary sources of innovative ideas, information, and practices. Organizations are called upon to leverage this "knowledge" in their production processes to stimulate and consolidate their business development. This approach is characterized by reduced dependence on physical inputs and natural resources. A knowledge-based economy is founded on the crucial role of intangible assets within organisations as an enabler of modern economic growth.

== Overview ==
=== Description ===
A knowledge economy features a highly skilled workforce within both microeconomic and macroeconomic environment. Institutions and industries create employment opportunities that necessitate highly specialized skills to satisfy the demands of the global market. Knowledge is viewed as an additional input to labour, and capital. In principle, an individual's primary capital is constituted by knowledge, together with the ability to perform and to generate economic value.

In a knowledge economy, highly skilled jobs require excellent technical skills and relational skills such as problem-solving, the flexibility to interface with multiple discipline areas as well as the ability to adapt to changes as opposed to moving or crafting physical objects in conventional manufacturing-based economies. A knowledge economy stands in contrast to an agrarian economy, in which the primary economic activity is subsistence farming for which the main requirement is manual labour or an industrialized economy that features mass production in which most of the workers are relatively unskilled.

A knowledge economy emphasizes the importance of skills in a service economy, the third phase of economic development also called a post-industrial economy. It is related to an information economy, which emphasizes the importance of information as non-physical capital, and a digital economy, which emphasizes the degree to which information technology facilitates trade. For companies, intellectual property such as trade secrets, copyrighted material, and patented processes become more valuable in a knowledge economy than in earlier eras.

The global economy's transition to a knowledge economy is also referred to as the Information Age, bringing about an information society. The term knowledge economy was made famous by Peter Drucker as the title of Chapter 12 in his book The Age of Discontinuity (1969), which Drucker attributed to economist Fritz Machlup in 1962, originating in the idea of scientific management developed by Frederick Winslow Taylor.

=== Knowledge-based economy and human capital ===
In a knowledge economy, human intelligence is the key engine of economic development. It is an economy where members acquire, create, disseminate and apply knowledge to facilitate economic and social development.

An economic system that is not knowledge-based is considered to be inconceivable. It describes the process of consumption and production activities that are satisfied from the application of workers' expertise - intellectual capital and typically represents a significant level of individual economic activities in modern developed economies through building an interconnected and advanced global economy where sources of knowledge are the critical contributors.

The present concept of "knowledge" originates from the historical and philosophical studies by Gilbert Ryle and Israel Scheffler, who conducted knowledge to the terms "procedural knowledge" and "conceptual Knowledge" and identified two types of skills: "routine competencies or facilities" and "critical skills" that is intelligent performance; and it's further elaborated by Lundvall and Johnson who defined "knowledge" as falling in four broad categories:

- Know-what refers to knowledge about facts. Like information, experts utilize know-what to fulfill their jobs, such as with complex occupations such as law and medicine.
- Know-why refers to scientific knowledge of principles and laws of motion in nature. It concerns the theoretical research of scientific and technological fields, which is essential for allowing innovation in the production process and products development in areas such as universities and specialized firms. It can also reduce error frequency in trial and error procedures.
- Know-who refers to knowledge of specific and selective social relations, identifying the key persons who know the solutions and can perform under difficult scenarios. Finding the right people can be more essential to innovation than simply knowing basic scientific knowledge.
- Know-how refers to practical skills which allow individuals to do different kinds of things. Individuals share experiences in groups with uniform practices. It constitutes the human capital of enterprises.

The World Bank has spoken of knowledge economies by associating it with a four-pillar framework that analyses the rationales of human capital-based economies:

- An educated and skilled labour force is required to establish a strong knowledge-based economy where workers continuously learn and apply their skills to build and practice knowledge efficiently.
- A dense and modern information infrastructure provides easy access to information and communication technology (ICT) resources to overcome the barrier of high transaction costs and to facilitate the effectiveness in interacting, disseminating and processing the information and knowledge resources.
- An effective innovation system is needed to support a great level of innovation within firms, industries, and countries, allowing them to keep up with the latest global technology and human intelligence to utilize it for the domestic economy.
- Institutional regime that supports incentives for entrepreneurship and the use of knowledge suggests that an economic system should offer incentives for better efficiency in mobilizing and allocating resources and encourage entrepreneurship.

The advancement of a knowledge-based economy occurred when global economies promote changes in material production, together with the creation of rich mechanisms of economic theories after the Second World War that tend to integrate science, technology and the economy.

Peter Drucker discussed the knowledge economy in the book The Effective Executive 1966, where he described the difference between the manual workers and the knowledge workers. The manual worker is the one who works with their own hands and produces goods and services. In contrast, the knowledge worker works with their head rather than hands and produces ideas, knowledge, and information.

== Information versus knowledge ==
Definitions around "knowledge" are considered to be vague in terms of the formalization and modeling of a knowledge economy, as it is rather a relative concept. For example, there is no sufficient evidence and consideration for whether the "information society" could serve or act as the "knowledge society" interchangeably. Information in general, is not equivalent to knowledge. Their use depends on the individual and group's preferences which are "economy-dependent". Information and knowledge together are production resources that can exist without interacting with other sources. Resources are highly independent of each other in the sense that if they connect with other available resources, they transfer into factors of production immediately, and production factors are present only to interact with other factors. Knowledge associated with intellectual information then is said to be a production factor in the new economy that is distinguished from traditional production factors.

== Evolution ==
From the early days of economic studies, though economists recognised the essential link between knowledge and economic growth, knowledge was still identified only as a supplemental element in economic factors. The idea behind it has transformed recently when new growth theory praised knowledge and technology in enhancing productivity and economic advancement.

=== Overview ===
The developed society has transitioned from an agriculture-based economy, that is, the pre-industrial age where economy and wealth were primarily based upon agriculture, to an industrial economy where the manufacturing sector was booming. In the mid-1900s, world economies moved towards a post-industrial or mass production system, where they were driven by the service sector that creates greater wealth versus manufacturing; to the late 1900s - 2000s, knowledge economy emerged with the highlights of the power of knowledge and human capital sector, and it's now marked as the latest stage of development in global economic restructuring. In the final decades of 20th century, the knowledge economy became greatly associated with sectors based in research-intensive and high-technology industries as a result of the steadily increased demand for sophisticated science-based innovations. The knowledge economy operates differently from the past as it has been identified by the upheavals (sometimes referred to as the knowledge revolution) in technological innovations and the globally competitive need for differentiation with new goods and services, and processes that develop from the research community (i.e., R&D factors, universities, labs, educational institutes). Thomas A. Stewart points out that just as the Industrial Revolution did not end agriculture because people have to eat, the Knowledge Revolution is unlikely to end manufacturing industries because of ongoing societal demands for physical goods and services.

For the modern knowledge economies, especially in developed countries, information, and knowledge have always taken on enormous importance in the development of either traditional or industrial economies, particularly with the efficient use of factors of production. Owners of production factors should possess and master information and knowledge so as to apply them to economic activity. In the knowledge economy, the specialised labor force is characterised as computer literate and well-trained in handling data, developing algorithms and simulated models, and innovating on processes and systems. Harvard Business School Professor Michael Porter asserts that today's economy is far more dynamic and that the conventional notion of comparative advantages within a company has changed and is less relevant than the prevailing idea of competitive advantages which rests on "making more productive use of inputs, which requires continual innovation". Therefore, the technical STEM careers, including computer scientists, engineers, chemists, biologists, mathematicians, and scientific inventors will continue to see demand. Porter further argues that well-situated clusters (that is, geographic concentrations of interconnected companies and institutions in a particular field) are vital with global economies, connect locally and globally with linked industries, manufacturers, and other entities that are related by skills, technologies, and other common inputs. Knowledge is the catalyst and connective tissue in modern economies. Ruggles and Holtshouse argue the change is characterised by a dispersion of power and by managers who lead by empowering knowledge workers to contribute and make decisions.

=== Green infrastructure ===
With Earth's depleting natural resources, the need for green infrastructure, a logistics industry forced into just-in-time deliveries, growing global demand, regulatory policy governed by performance results, and a host of other items place a priority on knowledge, and research becomes paramount. Technical knowledge helps with problem-solving, measuring performance, and managing data. These skills are used to handle complex projects that involve different countries and different areas of study.

=== Prevailing and future economic development ===
Prevailing and future economic development will be dominated by technology and network expansion, in particular on knowledge-based social entrepreneurship and entrepreneurship as a whole. The knowledge economy is incorporating the network economy, where the relatively localised knowledge is being shared among and across various networks for the benefit of all network members, to gain economies of scale in a wider scale.

== Globalisation ==
The rapid globalisation of economic activities is one of the main determinants of the emerging knowledge economy. While there are no doubts on the other stages of relative openness in the global economy, the prevailing pace and intensity of globalisation are without precedent. Fundamental microeconomic forces are the significant drivers of globalizing economic activities and further demands for human intelligence. These forces include the rapid integration of the world's financial and capital markets since the early 1980s, which influences essentially each level of the developed country's financial and economic systems; increased multinational origin of the inputs to productions of both goods and services, technology transfers and information flow.

== Examples of knowledge economies ==
Worldwide examples congregate around regions or cities with high concentrations of talented human capital and are often accompanied with high tech-oriented companies as well as innovative tech hubs. The knowledge economic hubs include information technology in Silicon Valley, United States; water and agricultural technology in Silicon Wadi, Israel; aerospace and automotive engineering in Munich, Germany; biotechnology in Hyderabad, India; electronics and digital media in Seoul, South Korea; petrochemical and the renewable energy industry in Brazil. Many other cities and regions try to follow a knowledge-driven development paradigm and increase their knowledge base by investing in higher education and research institutions to attract highly skilled labour and better position themselves in the global competition. Yet, despite digital tools democratising access to knowledge, research shows that knowledge economy activities remain as concentrated as ever in traditional economic cores.

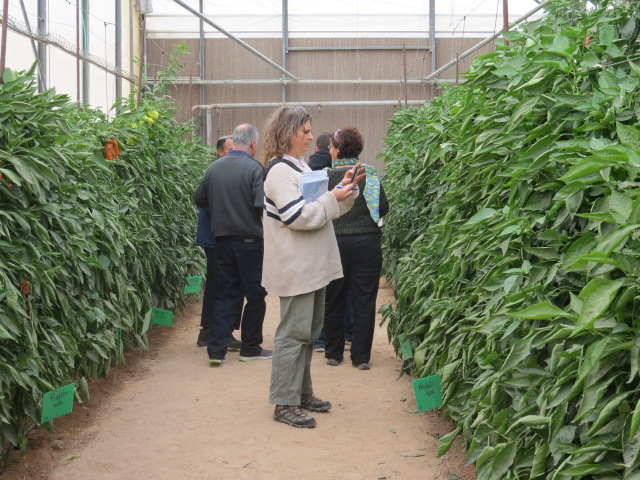
Yair Agricultural Research and Development Station, Israel

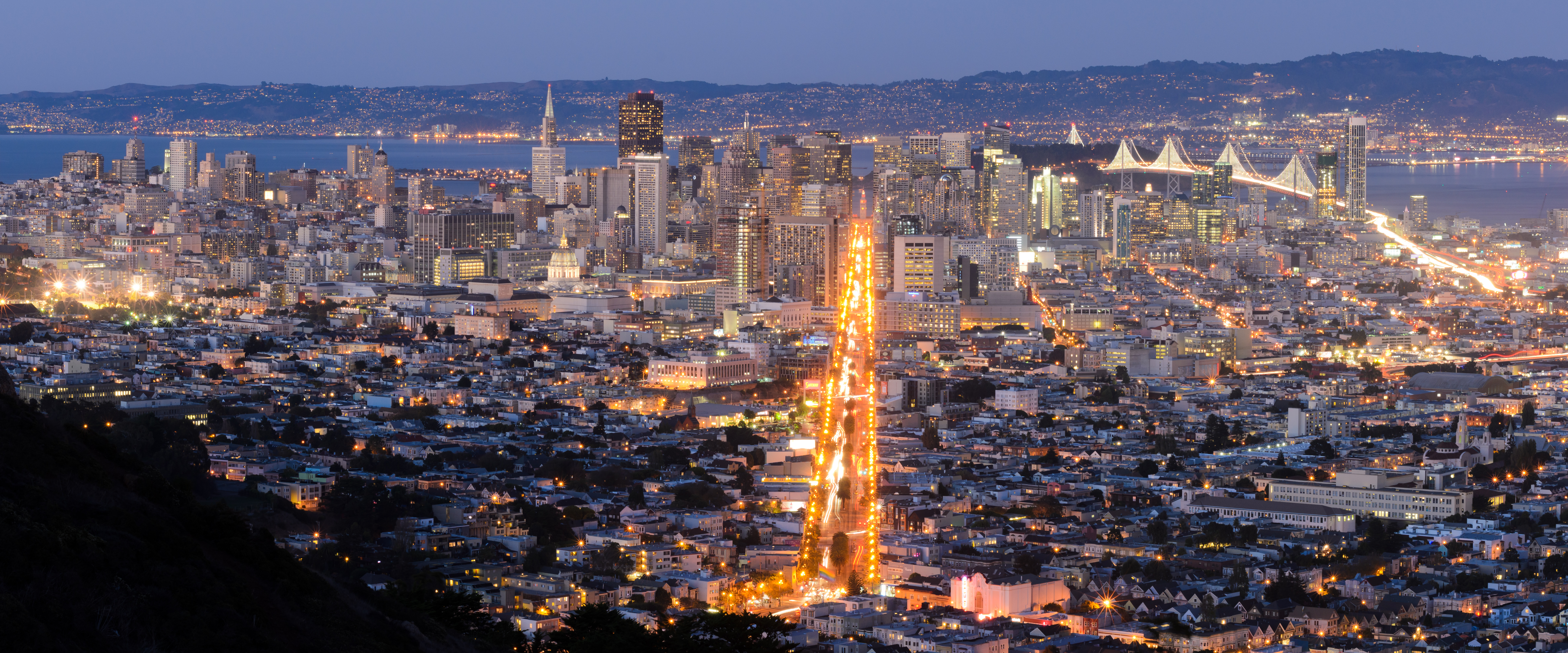
San Francisco, California, US. The city is a central city in Silicon Valley.

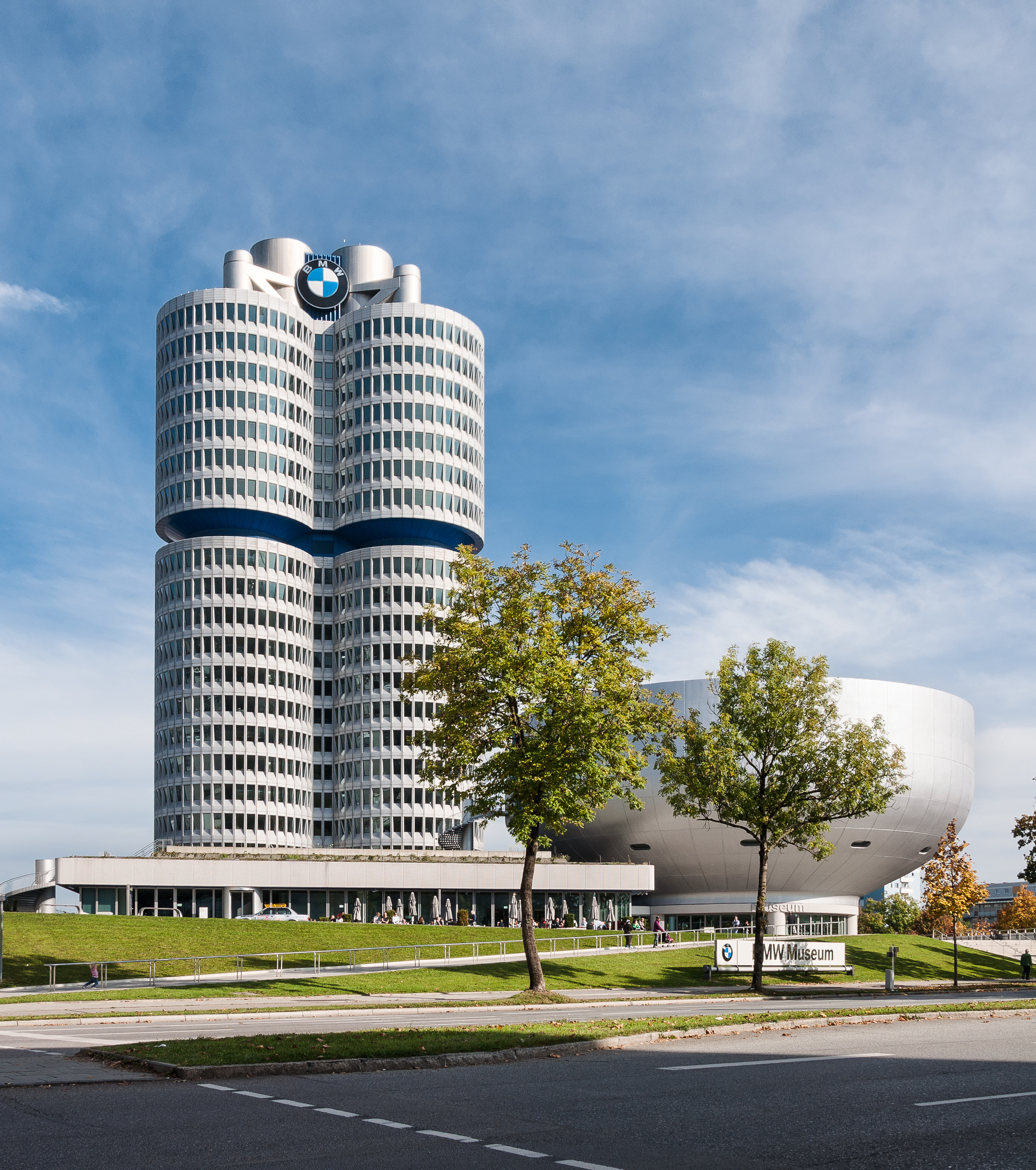
Munich, Germany

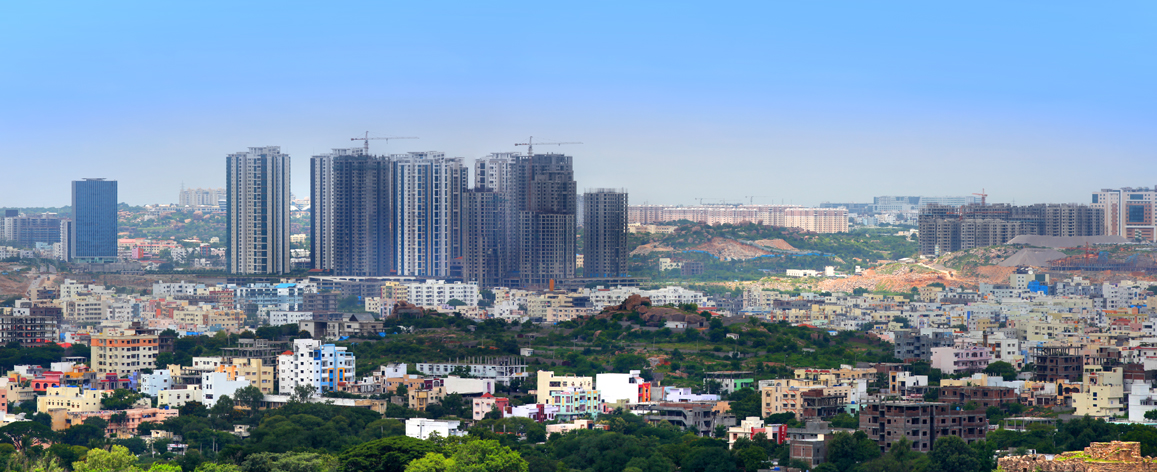
Hyderabad, India

== Technology ==
The technology requirements for a national innovation system, as described by the World Bank Institute, must be able to disseminate a unified process by which a working method may converge scientific and technology solutions and organizational solutions. According to the World Bank Institute's definition, such innovation would further enable the World Bank Institute's vision outlined in its Millennium Development Goals.

=== Challenges for developing countries ===
The United Nations Commission on Science and Technology for Development report (UNCSTD, 1997) concluded that for developing countries to integrate ICTs successfully and sustainable development to participate in the knowledge economy, they need to intervene collectively and strategically. Suggested collective intervention includes the development of effective national ICT policies that support the new regulatory framework, promote the selected knowledge production, and use of ICTs and harness their organizational changes to be in line with the Millennium Development Goals. The report further suggests that developing countries develop the required ICT strategies and policies for institutions and regulations, considering the need to be responsive to the issues of convergence.

== See also ==
- Attention economy
- Automation
- Basic income guarantee
- Cognitive-cultural economy
- Computational knowledge economy
- Digital Revolution
- Digital economy
- Endogenous growth theory
- Frugal innovation
- History of knowledge
- Information economy
- Indigo Era
- Industrial espionage
- International Innovation Index
- Internet economy
- Information revolution
- Information society
- Know-how trading
- Knowledge Economic Index
- Knowledge market
- Knowledge organization
- Knowledge management
- Knowledge policy
- Knowledge production modes
- Knowledge society
- Knowledge tagging
- Knowledge transfer § In the knowledge economy
- Knowledge value chain
- Learning economy
- Learning society
- Liverpool Knowledge Quarter
- Long tail
- Network economy
- Precision agriculture
- Productivity improving technologies (historical)
- Smart city
- Social information processing
- Working hours

== Bibliography ==
- Arthur, W. B. (1996). Increasing Returns and the New World of Business Archived 2019-07-27 at the Wayback Machine. Harvard Business Review(July/August), 100–109.
- Bell, D. (1974). The Coming of Post-Industrial Society: A Venture in Social Forecasting. London: Heinemann.
- Alan, Burton-Jones (1999). Knowledge Capitalism: Business, Work, and Learning in the New Economy. Oxford: Oxford University Press. ISBN 978-0-19-829622-5.
- Drucker, P. (1969). The Age of Discontinuity; Guidelines to Our changing Society. New York: Harper and Row.
- Drucker, P. (1993). Post-Capitalist Society. Oxford: Butterworth Heinemann.
- Machlup, F. (1962). The Production and Distribution of Knowledge in the United States. Princeton: Princeton University Press.
- Porter, M. E. Clusters and the New Economics of Competition. Harvard Business Review. (Nov-Dec 1998). 77–90.
- Powell, Walter W. & Snellman, Kaisa (2004). "The Knowledge Economy". Annual Review of Sociology 30 (1): 199–220
- Rindermann H. (2012). Intellectual classes, technological progress and economic development: The rise of cognitive capitalism. Personality and Individual Differences 53 (2) 108–113
- Rooney, D., Hearn, G., Mandeville, T., & Joseph, R. (2003). Public Policy in Knowledge-Based Economies: Foundations and Frameworks. Cheltenham: Edward Elgar.
- Rooney, D., Hearn, G., & Ninan, A. (2005). Handbook on the Knowledge Economy. Cheltenham: Edward Elgar.
- Stehr, Nico (2002). Knowledge and Economic Conduct. The Social Foundations of the Modern Economy. Toronto: University of Toronto Press.
- The Brookings Institution. MetroPolicy: Shaping A New Federal Partnership for a Metropolitan Nation. Metropolitan Policy Program Report. (2008). 4–103.
