= Knowledge intensive business services =

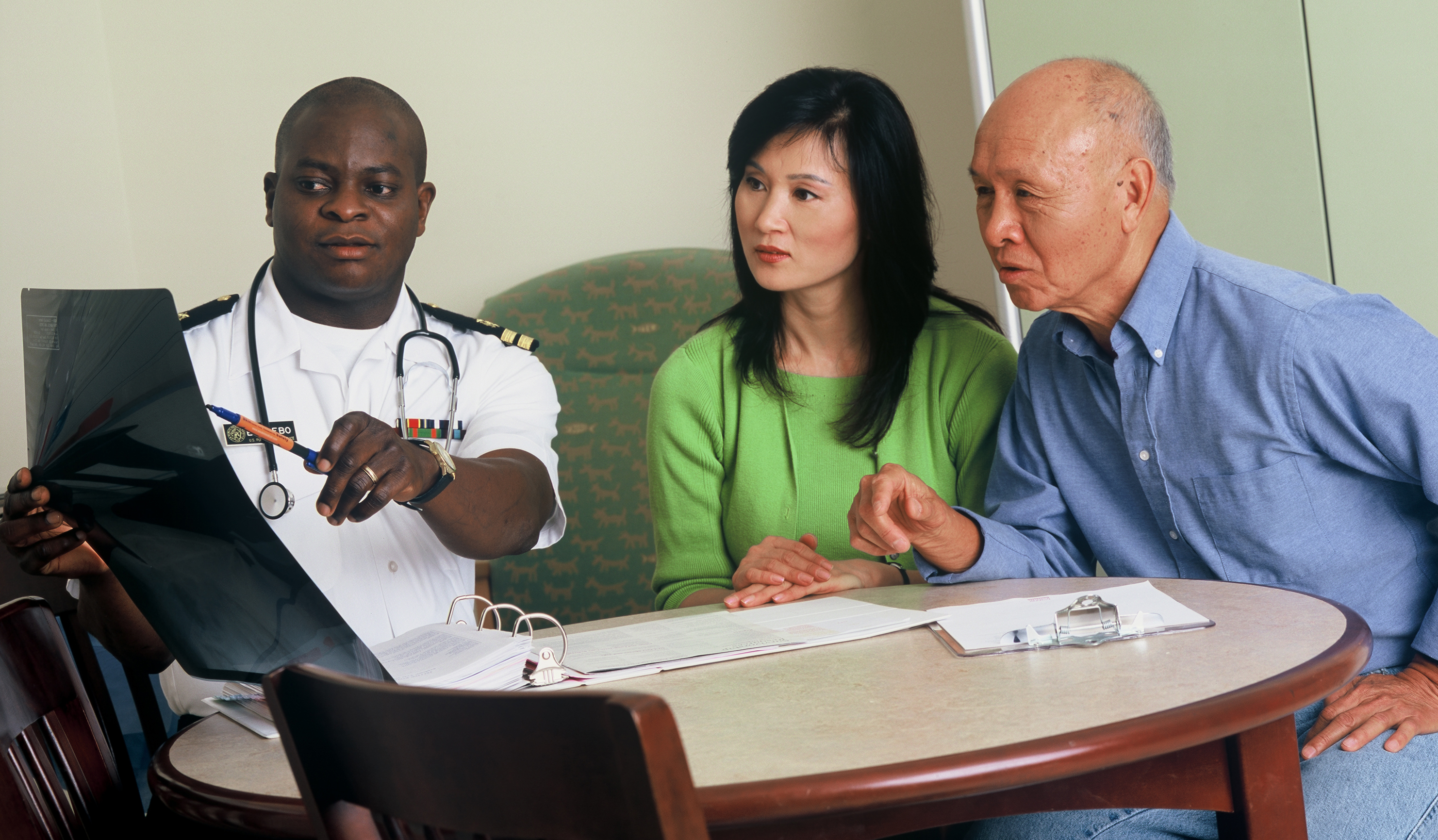
Doctor explains X-ray images to a patient

Knowledge Intensive Business Services (commonly known as KIBS) are services and business operations heavily reliant on professional knowledge. They are mainly concerned with providing knowledge-intensive support for the business processes of other organizations. As a result, their employment structures are heavily weighted towards scientists, engineers, and other experts. It is common to distinguish between T-KIBS, (those with high use of scientific and technological knowledge - R&D services, engineering services, computer services, etc.), and P-KIBS, who are more traditional professional services - legal, accountancy, and many management consultancy and marketing services. These services either supply products which are themselves primary sources of information and knowledge, or use their specialist knowledge to produce services which facilitate their clients own activities. Consequently, KIBS usually have other businesses as their main clients, though the public sector and sometimes voluntary organisations can be important customers, and to some extent households will feature as consumers of, for instance, legal and accountancy services.

The first discussion of KIBS to use the term seems to have been in a 1995 report to the European Commission "Knowledge-Intensive Business Services: Users, Carriers and Sources of Innovation" In the decade since this appeared these sectors of the economy have continued to outperform most other sectors, and have accordingly attracted a good deal of research and policy attention. They are particularly of interest in European countries such as Finland. Care should be taken in reading literature on the topic, since a number of related terms are in wide use. The European Union has recently been referring to a much broader concept of knowledge intensive services (extending well beyond the business services) and to business-related services (including many services which have large markets among final consumers).

An extract from a description found in Harvard Business Online tells us: "A common characteristic of knowledge-intensive business service (KIBS) firms is that clients routinely play a critical role in co-producing the service solution along with the service provider. This can have a profound effect on both the quality of the service delivered as well as the client's ultimate satisfaction with the knowledge-based service solution. By strategically managing client co-production, service providers can improve operational efficiency, develop more optimal solutions [sic], and generate a sustainable competitive advantage."

The European Monitoring Centre on Change (EMCC) has published online a number of reports and studies of KIBS. In the first of these, "Sector Futures: the knowledge-intensive business services sector" the KIBS sectors are defined in terms of the standard industrial classification (NACE revision 1). To summarise, the main KIBS sectors are:

From NACE Division 72: Computer and related activities

 72.1: 	Hardware consultancy
 72.2: 	Software consultancy and supply
 72.3: 	Data processing
 72.4: 	Database activities
 72.5: 	Maintenance and repair of office, accounting and computing machinery
 72.6: 	Other computer related activities

From NACE Division 73: Research and experimental development

 73.1: 	Research and experimental development on natural sciences and engineering
 73.2: 	Research and experimental development on social sciences and humanities

From NACE Division 74: Other business activities

 74.11: 	Legal activities
 74.12: 	Accounting, book-keeping and auditing activities; tax consultancy
 74.13: 	Market research and public opinion polling
 74.14: 	Business and management consultancy activities
 74.15: 	Management activities of holding companies
 74.20: 	Architectural and engineering activities and related technical consultancy
 74.3:  	Technical testing and analysis
 74.4:  	Advertising
 74.5:  	Labour recruitment and provision of personnel
 74.8:  	Miscellaneous business activities n.e.c.
 74.81: 	Photographic activities
 74.84: 	Other business activities n.e.c.

In the revision of NACE (rev. 2) there is some more clarity - most KIBS are located in section M (Professional, Scientific and Technical Activities), which is differentiated from more routine section N (Administrative and Support Service Activities). However, computer and related activities are in section J (Information and Communication Activities). The System in use in Canada and the USA, NAICS, does group these services together with the other KIBS.

These categories cover firms and organisations that specialise in producing these services. But other sectors may supply knowledge-intensive business services together with their main products; and such services are of course routinely produced by firms for their own use - almost all firms will have some internal office, computer, marketing activities, for instance. KIBS firms are simply specialists in these service activities, which these are their main products.

Some KIBS specialists may be lurking in many of these—are either knowledge-intensive services such as health, education, telecommunications, finance, or business-related services such as administration and security. But in general, the following sectors are not regarded as KIBS: Health/medical services, Postal services and Transport and Distribution (some specialised logistics services may be seen as KIBS), Consumer Financial and Real Estate services, Education services (other than specialised training for industry), Broadcast and other mass media (again with possible exceptions, such as when these media are also used for specialised delivery of business services as in data broadcast or encoded business video transmissions), public administration (again with some possible exceptions in industry support schemes), Repair/maintenance (with the exception of IT-related activities), retail and wholesale, Social welfare services, Hospitality, Catering, Leisure/tourism, Personal consumer services, Entertainment. Some consultancy and other specialist support KIBS-type activity often serves such industries.

The Knowledge Intensive Business Services (KIBS) are among the key topics of research in the sphere of innovation studies. As shown by the data collected during Community Innovation Surveys (CIS) recorded through such sources as CORDIS, KIBS are among the most innovative parts of the service industry Additionally, the services allow for the diffusion of innovations throughout their customer networks.
