= Quadruple and quintuple innovation helix framework =

Theory by Loet Leydesdorff on knowledge

The quadruple and quintuple innovation helix framework describes interactions within a knowledge economy, involving universities, industry, government – the triple helix model of innovation – complemented by the public – in a quadruple helix – and the environment – in a quintuple helix.

== History ==
In innovation helix framework theory, first developed by Henry Etzkowitz and Loet Leydesdorff and used in innovation economics and theories of knowledge, such as the knowledge society and the knowledge economy, each sector is represented by a circle (helix), with overlapping showing interactions.

The quadruple and quintuple innovation helix framework was co-developed by Elias G. Carayannis and David F.J. Campbell, with the quadruple helix being described in 2009 and the quintuple helix in 2010. Various authors were exploring the concept of a quadruple helix extension to the triple helix model of innovation around the same time. The Carayannis and Campbell quadruple helix model incorporates the public via the concept of a 'media-based democracy', which emphasizes that when the political system (government) is developing innovation policy to develop the economy, it must adequately communicate its innovation policy with the public and civil society via the media to obtain public support for new strategies or policies. In the case of industry involved in R&D, the framework emphasizes that companies' public relations strategies have to negotiate 'reality construction' by the media.

The quadruple and quintuple helix framework can be described in terms of the models of knowledge that it extends and by five subsystems (helices) that it incorporates; in a quintuple helix-driven model, knowledge and know-how are created and transformed, and circulate as inputs and outputs in a way that affects the natural environment. Socio-ecological interactions via the quadruple and quintuple helices can be utilized to define opportunities for the knowledge society and knowledge economy, such as innovation to address sustainable development, including climate change.

== Conceptual interrelationship of models of knowledge ==
The framework involves the extension of previous models of knowledge, specifically mode 1, mode 2, the triple helix, and mode 3, by adding the public and the environment:

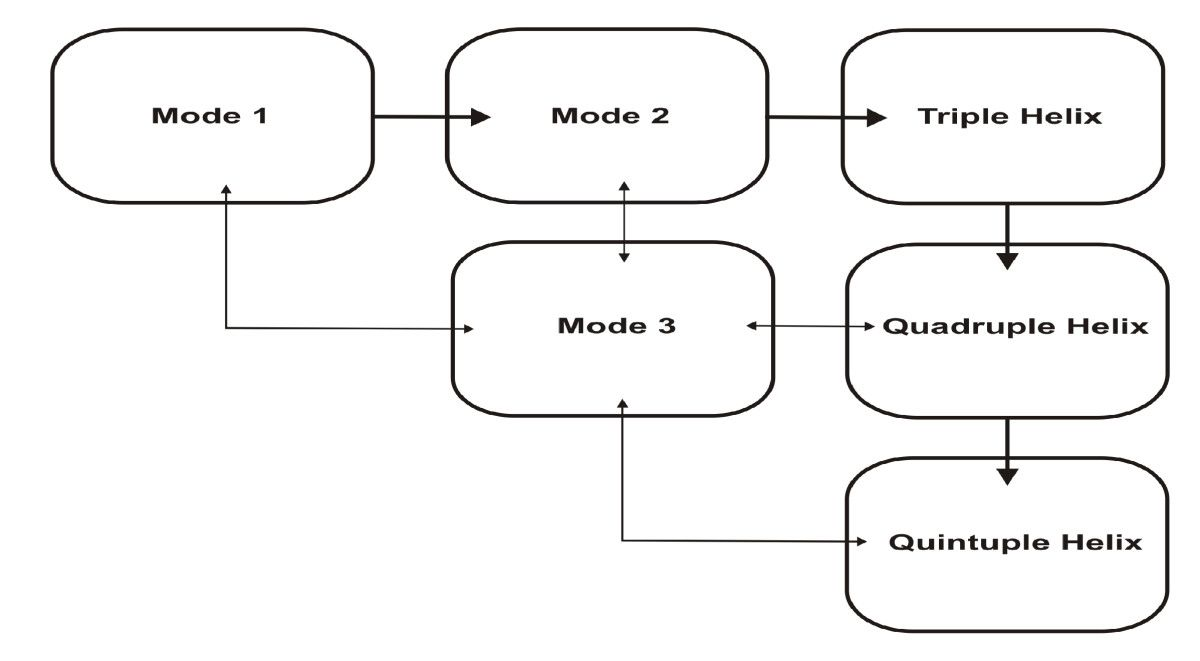
Figure 1: Evolution of the Models of Knowledge Creation in the Quintuple Helix

Mode 1. Mode 1 was theorized by Michael Gibbons and is an elderly linear model of fundamental university research where success is defined as "a quality or excellence that is approved by hierarchically established peers" and does not necessarily contribute to industry or the knowledge economy.

Mode 2. Mode 2 was also theorized by Michael Gibbons and is context-driven, problem-focused and interdisciplinary research characterized by the following five principles: (1) knowledge produced in the context of application; (2) transdisciplinarity; (3) heterogeneity and organizational diversity; (4) social accountability and reflexivity; (5) and quality control.

The Triple Helix model of innovation. The triple helix was first suggested by Henry Etzkowitz and Loet Leydesdorff in 1995 and emphasizes trilateral networks and hybrid organizations of university-industry-government relations to provide the infrastructure necessary for innovation and economic development; it provides a structural explanation for the historical evolution of mode 2 in relation to mode 1.

Mode 3. Mode 3 was developed by Elias G. Carayannis and David F.J. Campbell in 2006. Mode 3 emphasizes the coexistence and co-development of diverse knowledge and innovation modes, together with mutual cross-learning between knowledge modes and interdisciplinary and transdisciplinary knowledge.

Quadruple helix. The quadruple helix adds as fourth helix the public, specifically defined as the culture- and media-based public and civil society. This fourth helix includes, for example, sociological concepts like art, the creative industries, culture, lifestyles, media, and values.

Quintuple helix. The quintuple helix adds as fifth helix the natural environment, more specifically socio-ecological interactions, meaning it can be applied in an interdisciplinary and transdisciplinary way to sustainable development.

== The five helices ==
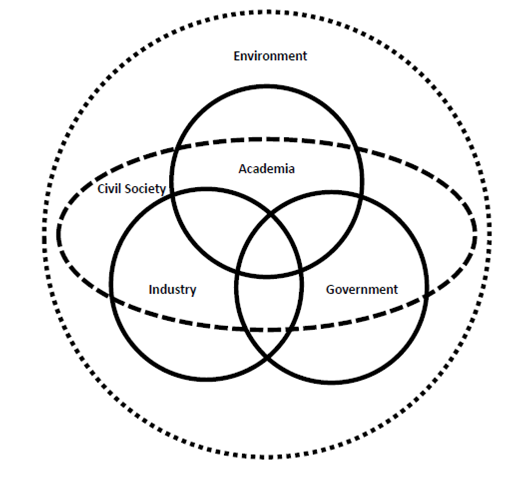
Figure 2: Five Helices of the Quintuple Helix

The main constituent element of the helical system is knowledge, which, through a circulation between societal subsystems, changes to innovation and know-how in a society (knowledge society) and for the economy (knowledge economy). The quintuple helix visualizes the collective interaction and exchange of this knowledge in a state by means of five subsystems (helices): (1) education system, (2) economic system, (3) natural environment, (4) media-based and culture-based public (also 'civil society'), (5) and the political system. Each of the five helices has an asset at its disposal, with a societal and scientific relevance, i.e., human capital, economic capital, natural capital, social capital and capital of information capital, and political capital and legal capital, respectively.

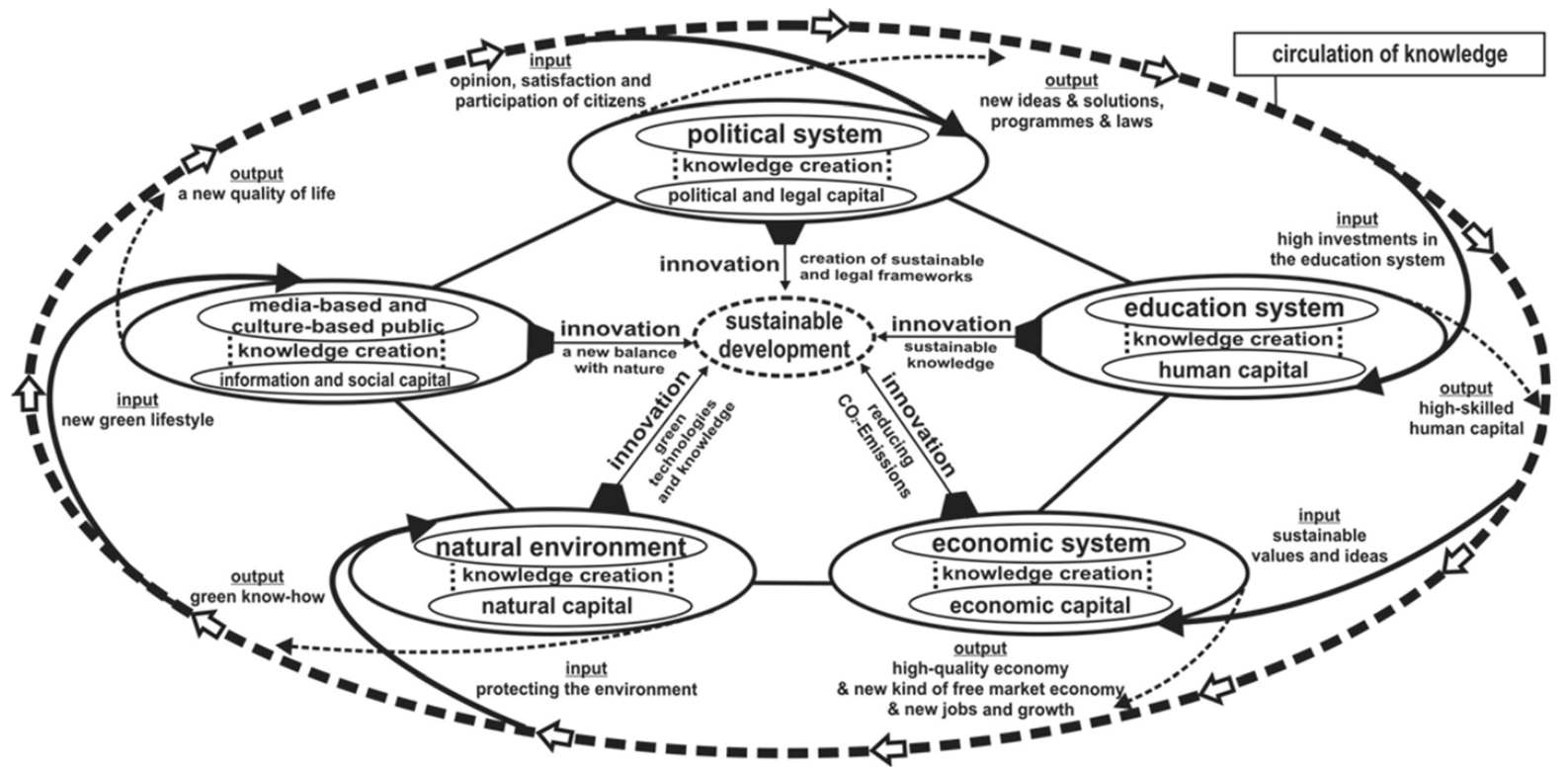
Figure 3: Effects of Investment in Education on Sustainable Development in Quintuple Helix

== Quadruple and quintuple helix and policy making ==
The quadruple helix has been applied to European Union-sponsored projects and policies, including the EU-MACS (EUropean MArket for Climate Services) project, a follow-up project of the European Research and Innovation Roadmap for Climate Services, and the European Commission's Open Innovation 2.0 (OI2) policy for a digital single market that supports open innovation.

== Quadruple and quintuple helix in academic research ==
The quadruple helix has implications for smart co-evolution of regional innovation and institutional arrangements, i.e., regional innovation systems. The quintuple helix has been applied to the quality of democracy, including in innovation systems; international cooperation; forest-based bioeconomies; the Russian Arctic zone energy shelf; regional ecosystems; smart specialization and living labs; climate change, and sustainable development, as well as to innovation diplomacy, a quintuple-helix based extension of science diplomacy.

== Criticism of the concept ==
How to define the new sectors of the public and the environment with regard to the standard triple helix model of innovation has been debated, and some researchers see them as additional sectors while others see them as different types of overarching sectors which contain the previous sectors. Beyond debates about how to define additional helices, some scholars argue that quadruple-helix variants can be challenging to operationalize consistently in empirical research. Role-based approaches in innovation ecosystem research therefore emphasize mapping actors by the functions they perform (e.g., connecting and convening/facilitating) rather than by sector categories alone. Such function-based perspectives can also account for the fact that the same organization may span multiple helices and shift roles as coordination needs change across an ecosystem’s development stages. Longitudinal work on network orchestration similarly finds that orchestrators adapt their roles over time in response to changing environments and lifecycle needs.

== See also ==
- Innovation economics
- Innovation system
- Knowledge economy
- Knowledge production modes
- Knowledge society
- Triple helix model of innovation
