= Knowledge production modes =

Term from the sociology of science

A knowledge production mode is a term from the sociology of science which refers to the way (scientific) knowledge is produced. So far, three modes have been conceptualized. Mode 1 production of knowledge is knowledge production motivated by scientific knowledge alone (basic research) which is not primarily concerned by the applicability of its findings. Mode 1 is founded on a conceptualization of science as separated into discrete disciplines (e.g., a biologist does not bother about chemistry). Mode 2 was coined in 1994 in juxtaposition to Mode 1 by Michael Gibbons, Camille Limoges, Helga Nowotny, Simon Schwartzman, Peter Scott and Martin Trow. In Mode 2, multidisciplinary teams are brought together for short periods address specific, real-world problems, with the aim of producing knowledge (applied research) within the context of knowledge society. Mode 2 can be explained by the way research funds are distributed among scientists and how scientists focus on obtaining these funds in terms of five basic features: knowledge produced in the context of application; transdisciplinarity; heterogeneity and organizational diversity; social accountability and reflexivity; and quality control. Subsequently, Carayannis and Campbell described a Mode 3 knowledge in 2006.

== Development of the concept ==
Gibbons and colleagues argued that a new form of knowledge production began emerging in the mid-20th century that was context-driven, problem-focused and interdisciplinary. It involved multidisciplinary teams that worked together for short periods of time on specific problems in the real world. Gibbons and his colleagues labelled this "Mode 2" knowledge production. He and his colleagues distinguished this from traditional research, labelled 'Mode 1', which is academic, investigator-initiated and discipline-based knowledge production. In support, Limoges wrote, "We now speak of 'context-driven' research, meaning 'research carried out in a context of application, arising from the very work of problem solving and not governed by the paradigms of traditional disciplines of knowledge." John Ziman drew a similar distinction between academic science and post-academic science, and in 2001 Helga Nowotny, Peter Scott and Michael Gibbons extended their analysis to the implications of Mode 2 knowledge production for society.

== Conceptual differences between Mode 1 and Mode 2 knowledge ==
Mode 1 is characterized by theory building and testing within a discipline towards the aim of universal knowledge, while Mode 2 is characterized by knowledge produced for application. In the type of knowledge acquired, Mode 1 knowledge is universal law, primarily cognitive, while Mode 2 knowledge is particular and situational, and in Mode 1 data is context free but in Mode 2 contextually embedded. In Mode 1, the knowledge is validated by logic and measurement, together with consistency of prediction and control, while in Mode 2 knowledge is validated by experiential, collaborative, and transdisciplinary processes. In Mode 1, the researcher's role is to be a detached, neutral observer, while in Mode 2 the researcher is a socially accountable, immersed and reflexive actor or change agent.

== Mode 3 ==
Carayannis and Campbell describe a Mode 3 knowledge, which emphasizes the coexistence and co-development of diverse knowledge and innovation modes, at the individual (micro or local), structural and organizational (meso or institutional), and systemic (macro or global) levels. It describes mutual interdisciplinary and transdisciplinary knowledge via concepts such as, at the micro level, creative milieus and entrepreneurs and employees, at the meso level, knowledge clusters, innovation networks, entrepreneurial universities, and academic firms, and at the macro level, the quadruple and quintuple innovation helix framework, the "democracy of knowledge" (knowledge within a democratic system), and "democratic capitalism" (capitalism within a democratic system).

== Reception ==
While the theory of knowledge production modes and especially the notion of Mode 2 knowledge production have attracted considerable interest, the theory has not been universally accepted in the terms put forth by Gibbons and colleagues. Scholars in science policy studies have pointed to three types of problems with the concept of Mode 2: its empirical validity, its conceptual strength, and its political value.

Concerning the empirical validity of the Mode 2 claims, Etzkowitz and Leydesdorff argue that:

The so-called Mode 2 is not new; it is the original format of science (or art) before its academic institutionalization in the 19th century. Another question to be answered is why Mode 1 has arisen after Mode 2: the original organizational and institutional basis of science, consisting of networks and invisible colleges. Where have these ideas, of the scientist as the isolated individual and of science separated from the interests of society, come from? Mode 2 represents the material base of science, how it actually operates. Mode 1 is a construct, built upon that base in order to justify autonomy for science, especially in an earlier era when it was still a fragile institution and needed all the help it could get (references omitted).

Thus, Mode 1 is essentially a theoretical construct, not a description of actual scientific research, as the boundaries between different disciplines and "basic" and "applied research" have always been blurred. In the same article, Etzkowitz and Leydesdorff use the notion of the triple helix of the nation state (government), academia (university) and industry to explain innovation, the development of new technology and knowledge transfer. Etzkowitz and Leydesdorff argue, "The Triple Helix overlay provides a model at the level of social structure for the explanation of Mode 2 as an historically emerging structure for the production of scientific knowledge, and its relation to Mode 1."

Steve Fuller similarly criticized the "modists" view of the history of science because they wrongly give the impression that Mode 1 dates back to seventeenth-century Scientific Revolution whereas Mode 2 is traced to the end of either World War II or the Cold War, whereas in fact the two modes were institutionalized only within a generation of each other (the third and the fourth quarters of the nineteenth century, respectively). Fuller claims that the Kaiser Wilhelm Institutes in Germany, jointly funded by the state, the industry and the universities, predated today's "triple helix" institutions by an entire century.

Regarding the conceptual strength of Mode 2, it has been argued that the coherence of its five features is questionable, as there might be a lot of multi-disciplinary, application oriented research that does not show organizational diversity or novel types of quality control. Moreover, Mode 2 lends itself to a normative reading, and authors have criticized the way Gibbons and his co-authors seem to blend descriptive and normative elements. According to Godin, the Mode 2 approach is more a political ideology than a descriptive theory. Similarly, Shinn complains: "Instead of theory or data, the New Production of Knowledge—both book and concept—seems tinged with political commitment".

== Applications to academic research ==
One of the fields which has implemented mode-based knowledge production research most enthusiastically is that of management and organization studies. MacLean, MacIntosh and Grant offer a review of Mode 2 management research, while MacIntosh, Bonnet, and Eikeland review the ways in which Mode 2-influenced management research has an impact on the lives of those working in organizations; Mode 2's implications have also been considered in terms of business processes The role of the different knowledge production modes has been considered in diverse fields, for example evidence-based policy making, fisheries, entrepreneurship and innovation, medical research, science diplomacy, sustainability science, and working life research.
