= Quadruple helix =

Quadruple helix may refer to:

- G-quadruplex secondary structures formed in nucleic acids.
- Quadruple helix model of innovation economics.
