= Yeni Fikir =

Azerbaijani business incubator and startup accelerator

New Idea
- Native name: Yeni Fikir
- Founded: 2013

New Idea (Azerbaijani: Yeni Fikir) is a business incubator and startup accelerator based in Azerbaijan.

The New Idea (Yeni Fikir) startup competition has been held since 2013. 977 start-up projects have been involved in the competition, which has been held six times so far, and the development of the 40 most promising start-up projects selected from them has been supported by incubation services, including seed investment opportunities. However, during the process, thousands of business entrepreneurs were provided with training and mentoring services for innovation and entrepreneurship in startup business.

Since 2013, approximately $260,000 has been invested in the development of startups involved in the competition, as well as the innovation ecosystem. Thus, during each competition, training and mentoring services were provided for the formation of new startups, as well as the development of existing startups, and the development of the selected most promising startups was supported by incubation services, including seed investment opportunities.

New Idea combines two independent incubation and acceleration centers for the development of promising startups.

Yeni Fikir LLC currently cooperates with various university and scientific research institutions, as well as the Free Economic Zones Agency, SMBDA and various private companies.
