= National innovation system =

System of national development

The National Innovation System (also NIS, National System of Innovation) is the flow of technology and information among people, enterprises and institutions which is key to the innovative process on the national level. According to innovation system theory, innovation and technology development are results of a complex set of relationships among actors in the system, which includes enterprises, universities and government research institutes.

== Origins of term ==
The term National System of Innovation originated when Christopher Freeman and Bengt-Åke Lundvall worked together in the late 1980s. Freeman's research drew heavily on political economy of Friedrich List and his historical account of the rise of Japan as an economic superpower. Lundvall's work explored the important social interactions between suppliers and customers and their role in encouraging innovation in Denmark. Apart from a general definition, as above, there is no canonical definition of national innovation systems. A few dominant definitions are listed below (quoted in an OECD publication) which overlap quite a bit:

A national system of innovation has been defined as follows:

- "... the network of institutions in the public and private sectors whose activities and interactions initiate, import, modify and diffuse new technologies."
- "... the elements and relationships which interact in the production, diffusion and use of new, and economically useful, knowledge ... and are either located within or rooted inside the borders of a nation state."
- "... a set of institutions whose interactions determine the innovative performance ... of national firms."
- "... the national institutions, their incentive structures and their competencies, that determine the rate and direction of technological learning (or the volume and composition of change generating activities) in a country."
- "... that set of distinct institutions which jointly and individually contribute to the development and diffusion of new technologies and which provides the framework within which governments form and implement policies to influence the innovation process. As such it is a system of interconnected institutions to create, store and transfer the knowledge, skills and artefacts which define new technologies."

A country’s innovative performance largely depends on how these actors relate to each other as elements of a collective system of knowledge creation and use as well as the technologies they use.Innovation performance of national innovation systems is often benchmarked using indicator frameworks such as the European Innovation Scoreboard (EIS), which compares countries using a set of performance indicators. Recent research has proposed approaches for aligning open innovation measurement with EIS indicators to assess how open innovation contributes to innovation ecosystems and innovation performance. For example, public research institutes, academia and industry serve as research producers carrying out research and development (R&D) activities. On the other hand, governments either central or regional play the role of coordinator among research producers in terms of their policy instruments, visions and perspectives for the future. Furthermore, in order to promote innovation the different innovative actors must have strong links with each other based on a strong level of trust and governments should promote and activate trust among the different innovation actors. The links can take the form of joint research, personnel exchanges, crosspatenting, and purchase of equipment. Finally, NSI are shaped by distinct socio-cultural qualities of national communities. Therefore, there are national trajectories of innovativeness, technology orientation and learning, which results in each nation, either highly developed or not, having some kind of NSI, no matter if working well or not. Furthermore, the success factors of NSI have been seen by many scholars in the creation of supportive institutions and organizations (with a key role of education) and collaboration links Bridging Scales in Innovation Policies throughout the various elements that constitute a NSI. Examples include public R&D and companies, as well as common objectives and innovative cultures of agents, altogether entailing self/reinforcing progress and synergies. Differences in the structures and strategies of NSI among various economically successful countries indicate, however, that there is no universal best practise recipe.

== See also ==
- American School
- Diffusion of innovations
- Friedrich List
- Innovation system
- Knowledge Assessment Methodology by the World Bank Institute
- Local innovation system
- Military–industrial complex
- Quadruple and quintuple innovation helix (Q2IH) framework
- Relational capital
- Regional innovation system
