= Alessandro Ludovico =

Italian researcher and artist

Alessandro Ludovico (born 1969) is a researcher, artist and chief editor of Neural magazine since 1993. He received his Ph.D. degree in English and Media from Anglia Ruskin University in Cambridge (UK). He is associate professor at the Winchester School of Art, University of Southampton. He has published and edited several books, and has lectured worldwide. He also served as an advisor for the Documenta 12 Magazine Project. He is one of the authors of the award-winning Hacking Monopolism trilogy of artworks ("Google Will Eat Itself", "Amazon Noir", "Face to Facebook").

== Biography ==
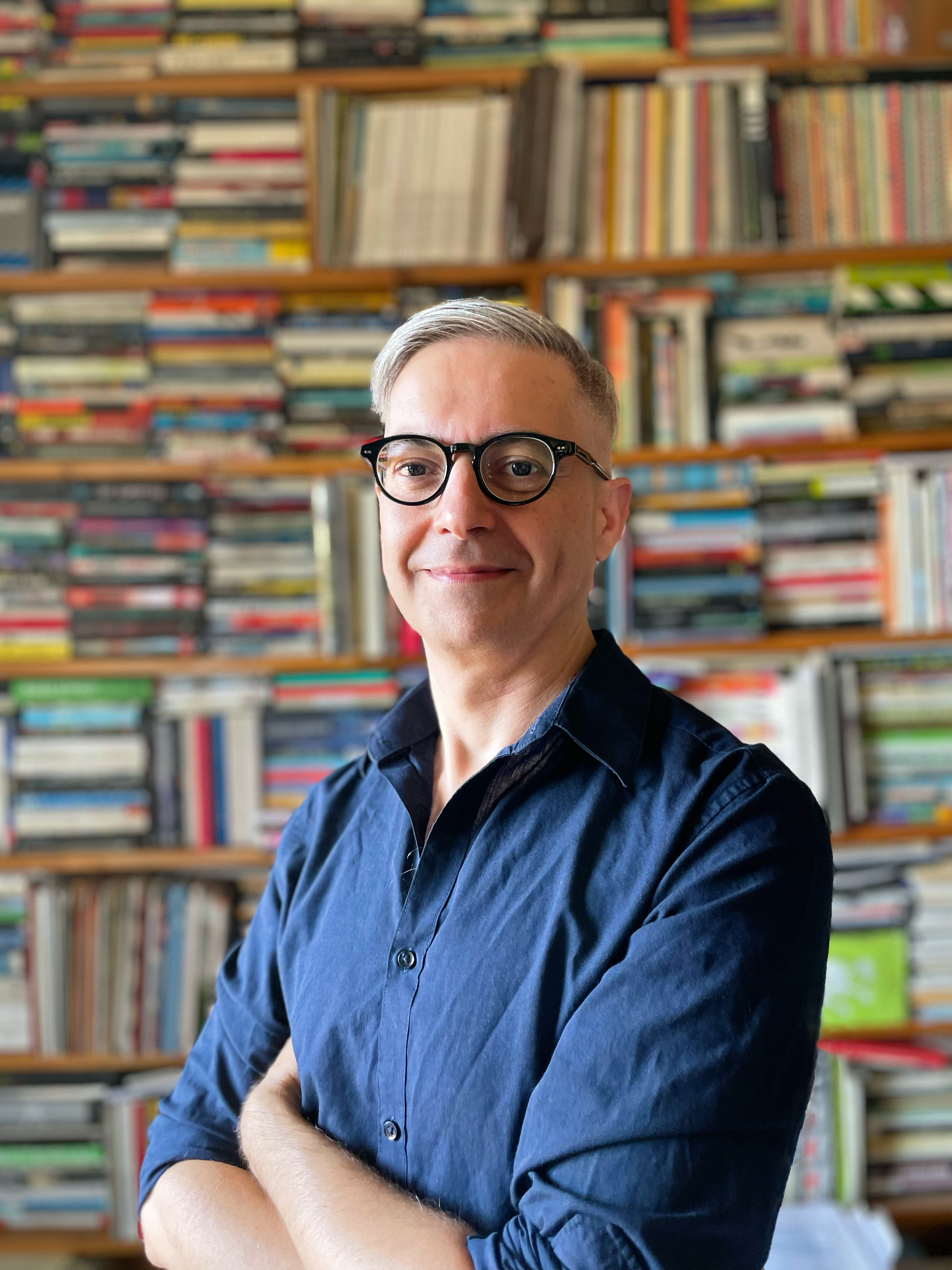
Alessandro Ludovico, Associate Professor in Art, Design and Media at the Winchester School of Art, at University of Southampton

Ludovico is one of the founding contributors to the Nettime community and one of the founders of the organization Mag.Net (Magazine Network of Electronic Cultural Publishers). He is a contributor to Springerin and has been a contributor for various media, including RTSI (Italian language Switzerland Radiotelevision). In 2001 he was part of the n.a.m.e. (normal audio media environment) art group and developed "Sonic Genoma", a computer/sound art installation. He also conducted "Neural Station", a weekly radio show on electronic music and digital culture on Controradio, Bari. He has written several books, including Virtual Reality Handbook, Internet Underground Guide, Suoni Futuri Digitali, la musica e il suo deflagrante impatto con la cultura digitale, Post-Digital Print, the mutation of publishing since 1894, which has been translated into Italian, French Korean, Spanish and Chinese, and Tactical Publishing, Using Senses, Software, and Archives in the Twenty-First Century,

== Significant works ==
- Ludovico, Alessandro (2012). "Post-Digital Print, the mutation of publishing since 1894]" (PDF). monoskop. Slovakia: monoskop.
- Ludovico, Alessandro (2024). "Tactical Publishing, Using Senses, Software, and Archives in the Twenty-First Century]". MIT Press. USA: MIT Press.

== See also ==
- Postdigital
- Neural magazine
- Information capital
- Dead Media Project
