= Ricardo Morales-Hernández =

Contemporary artist from San Juan, Puerto Rico

Ricardo Morales Hernández is a contemporary artist from San Juan, working on extemporaneous drawing narrating a personal, political and cosmic history. He uses analog, digital and biological media and is known for his paradisiac imagery reminiscent of the natural ecosystem of the colony of Puerto Rico.

His works evokes musical notations and graphic systems and in occasions are fed by participative practices of volunteers on internet or nomad workshops. Historical relations can be traced from: primitive markings, medieval marginalia, neo-expressionism, concrete art, conceptual and post-digital aesthetics while at the same time questioning the dominant discourses of contemporary art. He is full-time professor having deserted studies in Media Arts, Religion and Social Sciences. Had been recipient of multiples residencies, awards and scholarships among them AIR–CPW-Andy Warhol Foundation, National Endowment for the Arts, and the Center for Image Science in Austria.
