= Mode 1 =

Mode 1 may refer to:

- Mode I (archaeology), a prehistoric industry
- Mode 1, electric vehicle charging protocol according to IEC 62196
- Mode 1, a sociological term for the production of knowledge; see Knowledge production modes
