= Post-Digital Print =

Publication on the evolution of print media

Post-digital Print: The Mutation of Publishing Since 1894
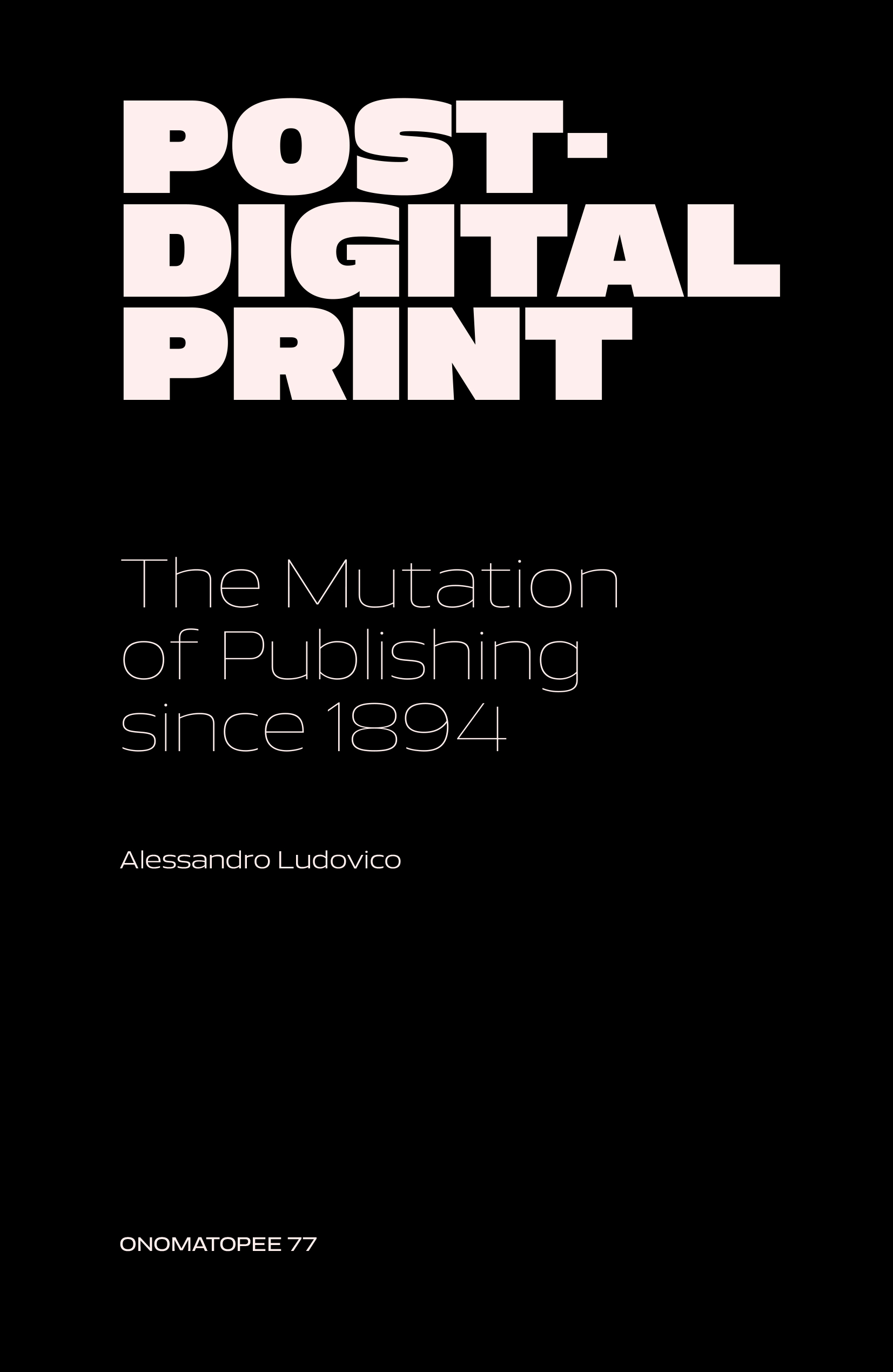
- Post-digital Print The Mutation of Publishing Since 1894, book cover
- Author: Alessandro Ludovico
- Language: English
- Published: published
- Publisher: Onomatopee
- Publication date: 2012
- Publication place: Netherlands
- Pages: 192
- ISBN: 9789491677014
- Website: http://postdigitalprint.org/

Post-Digital Print: The Mutation of Publishing since 1894 is a 194-page publication written by Alessandro Ludovico in 2012. This book is said to encompass post digital print and explain examples of the many ways print has been expanded on, changed, and different inventions that have come about over the post-digital age. Ludovico makes it a point to emphasize how print has been thought to die off since 1894 but how in his opinion it has done no such thing, but instead is needed for the future. The book is one of the 10 best books of 2019 recommended by LSE (London School of Economics).

== Author ==
The author Alessandro Ludovico was born in 1969 and resides in Bari, Italy. It is said that Ludovico has contributed greatly to the post digital age. This is due to his success as a Media critic and editor-in-chief of the magazine Neural since 1993, a host for the weekly radio show Neural Station, a collaborator of the Digital Kraft exhibitions, a founding contributor of the Nettime community, a founder of the organization Mag.Net, and a founder of the European Peripheral Magazine list.

== Synopsis ==
A chapter by chapter synopsis of the book has been depicted as follows by a review from the website We Make Money Not Art.

Chapter 1, “The death of paper (which never happened),” analyzes 7 moments when a new medium in history was thought to be a superior alternative to paper.

Chapter 2, “A history of alternative publishing reflecting the evolution of print,” depicts how artistic avant-garde has used print during the 20th century.

Chapter 3, “The mutation of paper: material paper in immaterial times,” looks at the explanations for why paper makes sense even in our digital age.

Chapter 4, “The end of paper: can anything actually replace the printed page?” critically views electronic devices, strategies, and platforms.

Chapter 5, “Distributed archives: paper content from the past, paper content for the future,” explores any long-term implications of choosing one medium over another.

Chapter 6, “The network: transforming culture, transforming publishing,” explains how working as a network can increase the quality of cultural entities.

== Content ==
According to Ludovico the first announcement of "the death of print" was in 1894. The book looks at how since that time independent bookshops, large bookshop chains, newspapers and magazines have to compete with Internet-based publishing or be wiped out. Ludovico explains how physical print publishing can survive and why he believes it is important that it should. He does this by tying together the current situation and future prospects of physical print publishing. It is explained that not every print technology was designed to print millions of copies. Spirit duplicators, photocopiers, and print-on-demand publishing allowed access to print for smaller print runs of projects with less mass appeal.

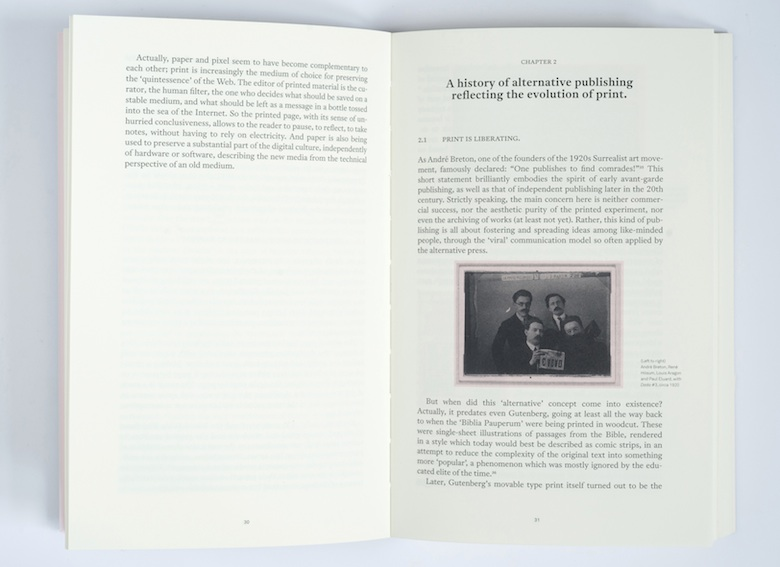
Post-Digital Print innerpages

Artists and political groups pushed the technology with pamphlets, unlicensed newspapers, the alternative press, fanzines, books, and journals. Ludovico establishes that due to how technology and the internet present the problem of filtering rather than access. This is not the only problem that he explains the print interface does not have. This Ludovico considers in depth when looking at eBooks which simulate print ever more closely which, according to a reviewer, confirms his argument that print is the better interface. This is also because the book explains that eBooks have an environmental impact that makes books look more appealing, and suffer all the problems of censorship and technological obsolescence that print now does not.

The reviewer of furtherfield.org believes that Ludovico certainly has the credibility that “lends his conclusions a context and authority that mere theory might lack.” This is because Ludovico is part of numerous art projects, events, and interventions that have placed him in the changes in publishing and textual media occurring over this period. He feels that printed materials are better interfaces, archives, and art objects than purely digital objects and therefore post-digital print and original print have to merge to spawn new models for carrying and spreading unprecedented amounts of information and culture.

== Publication ==
- (English) Post-digital Print: The Mutation of Publishing Since 1894, Onomatopee, ISBN 9789491677014, 2013.
- (Italian) Post-digital print. La mutazione dell'editoria dal 1894, CaratteriMobili, ISBN 9788896989500, 2014.
- (French) Post-digital print. La mutation de l'édition depuis 1894, B42, ISBN 9782917855751, 2016.
- (Korean) 포스트디지털 프린트 1894년 이후 출판의 변화, 미디어버스, ISBN 9788994027654, 2017.
