= Loet Leydesdorff =

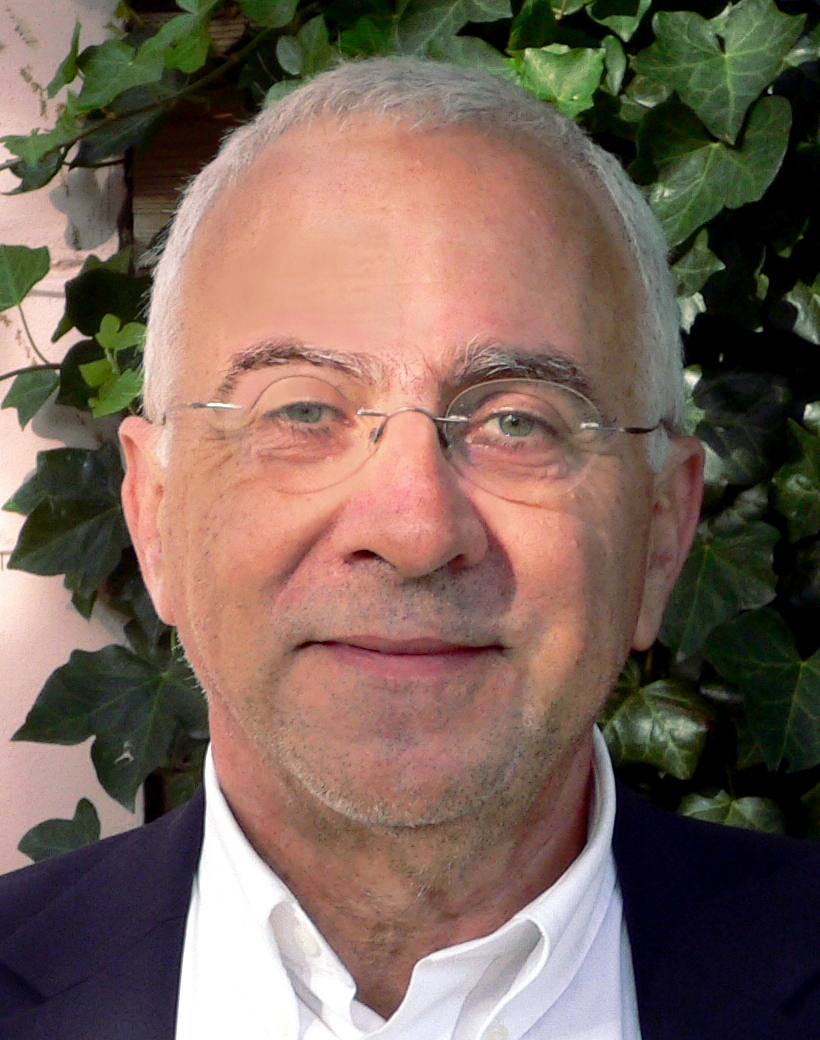
- Loet Leydesdorff, 2008.
- Born: Louis André Leydesdorff; August 21, 1948; Batavia (Dutch East Indies)
- Died: March 11, 2023 (aged 74); Amsterdam
- Awards: Derek de Solla Price Memorial Medal

Education
- Education: University of Amsterdam

Philosophical work
- Institutions: University of Amsterdam
- Main interests: Dynamics of Scientific Communication and Technological Innovation
- Notable ideas: Triple helix model of innovation
- Website: http://www.leydesdorff.net

Louis André (Loet) Leydesdorff (21 August 1948, Batavia (Dutch East Indies) - 11 March 2023, Amsterdam) was a Dutch sociologist, cyberneticist, communication scientist and Professor in the Dynamics of Scientific Communication and Technological Innovation at the University of Amsterdam. He was known for his work in the sociology of communication and innovation, especially for his Triple helix model of innovation developed with Henry Etzkowitz in the 1990s.

== Biography ==
Leydesdorff was born in 1948 in Batavia (present-day Jakarta), then the capital of the Dutch East Indies. He received a B.Sc. in chemistry in 1969, a M.Sc. biochemistry in 1973, and an M.A. in philosophy in 1977. In 1984 he obtained his Ph.D. in sociology at the University of Amsterdam.

In 1969 Leydesdorff started working as part-time professor for chemical technology at the Gerrit Rietveld Academie in Amsterdam. In 1972 he started his career at the University of Amsterdam as teaching assistant for "Science and Society" at the Philosophy Faculty. In 1980 he became Senior lecturer at the Department of Science & Technology Dynamics of the University of Amsterdam and from 2000 of the Amsterdam School of Communications Research as well, of which he remained an honorary fellow following his retirement as professor in 2013. Despite being diagnosed with Parkinson's disease in 2014 he continued to be an active scholar until he had to resign from his remaining duties in the fall of 2022. He died in Amsterdam on 11 March 2023.

Leydesdorff was on editorial boards of several journals since 1987. He was on the editorial boards of Scientometrics since 1987, Social Science Information, since 1994, Industry and Higher Education since 1997, Cybermetrics since 1997, the Journal of Technology Transfer since 1999, the TripleC: e-journal for cognition • communication • co-operation since 2002, the Science & Public Policy since 2004, Science Forum since 2005, Informetrics since 2006, and the International Journal of Applied Systemic Studies since 2006. He further worked for the Enterprise and Innovation Management Studies journal 1999–2001, for Science, Technology and Society in 2001-02 and for the Journal of the International Society for Scientometrics and Informetrics from 1995 to 1998. As contributing editor he also worked for Science, Technology, & Human Values 1988-1990 and for Science & Technology Studies 1987–1988.

He received the Derek de Solla Price Memorial Medal for scientometrics in 2003. Since 2006 he was Honorary Research Fellow at the Virtual Knowledge Studio of the Royal Netherlands Academy of Arts and Sciences and since 2007 Honorary Fellow of SPRU – Science and Technology Policy Research of the University of Sussex. He was president of the Dutch Systems Group society, the society that cofounded the International Federation for Systems Research in the early 1980s.

== Work ==
Leydesdorff's research interests were in the fields of the philosophy of science, social network analysis, scientometrics, and the sociology of innovation. His studies in communication in science, technology, and innovation enabled him to specify theory and methods for understanding the dynamics of knowledge-based development.

== Selected publications ==
Leydesdorff has published extensively in fields of systems theory, social network analysis, scientometrics, and the sociology of innovation. Books:

- 1987. The Social Direction of the Public Sciences: Causes and Consequences of Cooperation Between Scientists and Non-Scientific Groups. With Stuart Blume, Joske Bunders and Richard P. Whitley. Sociology of the Sciences Yearbook, Springer.
- 1994. Evolutionary Economics and Chaos Theory: New Directions in Technology Studies. With Peter Van Den Besselaar. Palgrave Macmillan.
- 2001. The Challenge of Scientometrics: the development, measurement, and self-organization of scientific communications, Universal Publishers
- 2001. A Sociological Theory of Communication: The Self-Organization of the Knowledge-Based Society. Universal Publishers/uPublish.com.
- 2005. Universities And The Global Knowledge Economy: A Triple Helix Of University-Industry-Government Relations. With Henry Etzkowitz. Continuum International Publishing Group.
- 2006. The Knowledge-Based Economy: Modeled, Measured, Simulated. Universal Publishers.
- 2021. "The Evolutionary Dynamics of Discursive Knowledge: Communication Theoretical Perspectives on an Empirical Philosophy of Science". In: Qualitative and Quantitative Analysis of Scientific and Scholarly Communication (Wolfgang Glänzel and Andrasz Schubert., Eds.). Cham, Switzerland: Springer Nature, 247 +ix pp.

Articles, a selection:

- 1994. "The Evolution of Communication Systems". In: Int. J. Systems Research and Information Science Vol 6, pp. 219–30.
- 2001. "The dynamics of innovation: from National Systems and ‘‘Mode 2’’ to a Triple Helix of university–industry–government relations". With Henry Etzkowitz. In: Research Policy, vol 29, pp 109–123.
- 2005. "Globalisation in the network of science in 2005: The diffusion of international collaboration and the formation of a core group". With Caroline S. Wagner.
- 2006. "Regional Development in the Knowledge-Based Economy: The Construction of Advantage". With Phil Cooke. In: Journal of Technology Transfer. Special Issue, pp. 1–15.
