= Innovation system =

The concept of the innovation system stresses that the flow of technology and information among people, enterprises, and institutions is key to an innovative process. It contains the interactions between the actors needed in order to turn an idea into a process, product, or service on the market.

== Development and diffusion of the concept ==
Systems of Innovation are frameworks for understanding innovation which have become popular particularly among policy makers and innovation researchers first in Europe, but now anywhere in the world as in the 1990s the World Bank and other UN-affiliated institutions accepted. The concept of a 'system of innovation' was introduced by B.-Å. Lundvall in 1985; "however, as he and his colleagues would be the first to agree (and as Lundvall himself points out), the idea actually goes back at least to Friedrich List's conception of "The National System of Political Economy" (1841), which might just as well have been called "The National System of Innovation". Christopher Freeman coined the expression National Innovation System in his 1988 study of the success of the Japanese economy. The concept, similarly used as "National System of Innovation" or "National Innovation System" was later applied to regions and sectors. According to innovation system theory, innovation and technology development are results of a complex set of relationships among actors in the system, which includes enterprises, universities and research institutes.

Innovation systems have been categorised into national innovation systems, regional innovation systems, local innovation systems, technological innovation systems and sectoral innovation systems.

There is no consensus on the exact definition of an innovation system, and the concept is still emerging. However, some define an innovation system as "a set of components and the causal relations influencing the generation and utilization of innovations and the innovative performance". Innovation is often the result of the interaction among an ecology of actors, and the term innovation ecosystem is occasionally used to emphasise this. For some, the expression innovation ecosystem is a subset or synonym of innovation system. Others separate between the expressions, using the expression innovation system for labelling a planned innovation environment, and innovation ecosystem for an ecological innovation environment. Due to growing interest of the "innovation ecosystem" concept, many argue that it has developed into a distinctive concept that is different from the innovation system concept. A contemporary conceptual review by Granstrand and Holgersson (2020) led to the definition of innovation ecosystems as "the evolving set of actors, activities, and artifacts, and the institutions and relations, including complementary and substitute relations, that are important for the innovative performance of an actor or a population of actors".

Recently, the debate also started to study the problems that affect green innovation since in addition to the issues typical of innovation generally (such as market failures related to limited appropriability of economic benefits of knowledge), green growth innovation is also hindered by market failures related to the environment (pollution externalities). It is possible (and not uncommon) for an innovation system to successfully support innovation in many technology areas, but not in ones related to green growth. For this reason, it is necessary to focus on addressing both kinds of failures in order to drive innovation towards a green growth trajectory.

== Standards of Innovation ==
The International Organization for Standardization published their standard ISO 56002, which contains all of the elements that is required to set up a structured management system for innovation. It builds on the overarching standard for management systems and follows the directives of all standard management systems. This standard was standardised into the European Norms and British Standards, and is known in the UK as BS EN ISO 56002:2019.

== Examples of definitions of National Innovation Systems ==
A national system of innovation has been defined as follows:

- "... the network of institutions in the public and private sectors whose activities and interactions initiate, import, modify and diffuse new technologies." (Freeman, 1987)
- "... the elements and relationships which interact in the production, diffusion and use of new, and economically useful, knowledge ... and are either located within or rooted inside the borders of a nation state." (Lundvall, 1992)
- "... a set of institutions whose interactions determine the innovative performance ... of national firms." (Nelson, 1993)
- "... the national institutions, their incentive structures and their competencies, that determine the rate and direction of technological learning (or the volume and composition of change generating activities) in a country." (Patel and Pavitt, 1994)
- "... that set of distinct institutions which jointly and individually contribute to the development and diffusion of new technologies and which provides the framework within which governments form and implement policies to influence the innovation process. As such it is a system of interconnected institutions to create, store and transfer the knowledge, skills and artefacts which define new technologies." (Metcalfe, 1995)
- "... all important economic, social, political, organisational, institutional, and other factors that influence the development, diffusion, and use of innovations." (Edquist, 2005).
- "... a human social network that behaves like a sociobiological system, wherein people have developed patterns of behaviour that minimise transaction costs caused by social barriers resulting from geography, lack of trust, differences in language and culture, and inefficient social networks." (Hwang and Horowitt, 2012)

== See also ==
- Collaborative innovation network
- Entrepreneurial ecosystem
- Frugal innovation
- Quadruple and quintuple innovation helix framework
- Relational capital
- Social innovation
- Startup ecosystem
- Technological innovation system
- Triple helix model of innovation
