= Technological innovation system =

Concept in innovation studies

The technological innovation system is a concept developed within the scientific field of innovation studies which serves to explain the nature and rate of technological change. A Technological Innovation System can be defined as ‘a dynamic network of agents interacting in a specific economic/industrial area under a particular institutional infrastructure and involved in the generation, diffusion, and utilization of technology’.

The approach may be applied to at least three levels of analysis: to a technology in the sense of a knowledge field, to a product or an artefact, or to a set of related products and artifacts aimed at satisfying a particular (societal) function’. With respect to the latter, the approach has especially proven itself in explaining why and how sustainable (energy) technologies have developed and diffused into a society, or have failed to do so. Technology improves throughout the years, and so do we.

== Background ==
The concept of a technological innovation system was introduced as part of a wider theoretical school, called the innovation system approach. The central idea behind this approach is that determinants of technological change are not (only) to be found in individual firms or in research institutes, but (also) in a broad societal structure in which firms, as well as knowledge institutes, are embedded. Since the 1980s, innovation system studies have pointed out the influence of societal structures on technological change, and indirectly on long-term economic growth, within nations, sectors or technological fields.

The purpose of analyzing a Technological Innovation System is to analyze and evaluate the development of a particular technological field in terms of the structures and processes that support or hamper it. Besides its particular focus, there are two, more analytical, features that set the Technological Innovation System approach apart from other innovation system approaches.

Firstly, the Technological Innovation System concept emphasizes that stimulating knowledge flows is not sufficient to induce technological change and economic performance. There is a need to exploit this knowledge in order to create new business opportunities. This stresses the importance of individuals as sources of innovation, something which is sometimes overseen in the, more macro-oriented, nationally or sectorally oriented innovation system approaches.

Secondly, the Technological Innovation System approach often focuses on system dynamics. The focus on entrepreneurial action has encouraged scholars to consider a Technological Innovation System as something to be built up over time. This was already put forward by Carlsson and Stankiewicz:

‘[T]echnological Innovation Systems are defined in terms of knowledge/competence flows rather than flows of ordinary goods and services. They consist of dynamic knowledge and competence networks. In the presence of an entrepreneur and sufficient critical mass, such networks can be transformed into development blocks, i.e. synergistic clusters of firms and technologies within an industry or a group of industries.’

This means that a Technological Innovation System may be analyzed in terms of its system components and/or in terms of its dynamics. Both perspectives will be explained below.

== Structures ==
The system components of a Technological Innovation System are called structures. These represent the static aspect of the system, as they are relatively stable over time. Three basic categories are distinguished:

- Actors: Actors involve organizations contributing to a technology, as a developer or adopter, or indirectly as a regulator, financier, etc. It is the actors of a Technological Innovation System that, through choices and actions, actually generate, diffuse and utilize technologies. The potential variety of relevant actors is enormous, ranging from private actors to public actors, and from technology developers to technology adopters. The development of a Technological Innovation System will depend on the interrelations between all these actors. For example, entrepreneurs are unlikely to start investing in their businesses if governments are unwilling to support them financially. Visa-verse, governments have no clue where financial support is necessary if entrepreneurs do not provide them with the information and the arguments they need to legitimate policy support.
- Institutions: Institutional structures are at the core of the innovation system concept. It is common to consider institutions as ‘the rules of the game in a society, or, more formally, (...) the humanly devised constraints that shape human interaction’. A distinction can be made between formal institutions and informal institutions, with formal institutions being the rules that are codified and enforced by some authority, and informal institutions being more tacit and organically shaped by the collective interaction of actors. Informal institutions can be normative or cognitive. The normative rules are social norms and values with moral significance, whereas cognitive rules can be regarded as collective mind frames, or social paradigms. Examples of formal institutions are government laws and policy decisions; firm directives or contracts also belong to this category. An example of a normative rule is the responsibility felt by a company to prevent or clean up waste. Examples of cognitive rules are search heuristics or problem-solving routines. They also involve dominant visions and expectations held by the actors.
- Technological factors: Technological structures consist of artefacts and the technological infrastructures in which they are integrated. They also involve the techno-economic workings of such artefacts, including costs, safety, reliability. These features are crucial for understanding the feedback mechanisms between technological change and institutional change. For example, if R&D subsidy schemes supporting technology development should result in improvements with regard to the safety and reliability of applications, this would pave the way for more elaborate support schemes, including practical demonstrations. These may, in turn, benefit technological improvements even more. It should, however, be noted here that the importance of technological features has often been neglected by scholars.

The structural factors are merely the elements that make up the system. In an actual system, these factors are all linked to each other. If they form dense configurations they are called networks. An example would be a coalition of firms jointly working on the application of a fuel cell, guided by a set of problem-solving routines and supported by a subsidy program. Likewise, industry associations, research communities, policy networks, user-supplier relations etc. are all examples of networks.

An analysis of structures typically yields insight into systemic features - complementarities and conflicts - that constitute drivers and barriers for technology diffusion at a certain moment or within a given period in time.

== Dynamics ==
Structures involve elements that are relatively stable over time. Nevertheless, for many technologies, especially newly emerging ones, these structures are not yet (fully) in place. For this reason, mostly, the scholars have recently enriched the literature on Technological Innovation Systems with studies that focus on the build-up of structures over time. The central idea of this approach is to consider all activities that contribute to the development, diffusion, and use of innovations as system functions. These system functions are to be understood as types of activities that influence the build-up of a Technological Innovation System. Each system function may be ‘fulfilled’ in a variety of ways. The premise is that, in order to properly develop, the system should positively fulfil all system functions. Various ‘lists’ of system functions have been constructed. Authors like Bergek et al., Hekkert et al., Negro and Suurs give useful overviews. These lists show much overlap and differences reside mostly in the particular way of clustering activities. An example of such a list is provided below.

Note that it is also possible that activities negatively contribute to a system function. These negative contributions imply a (partial) breakdown of the system. In particular, domestic instability has been shown to exert downward pressure on innovation systems, while international threats and national security alliances have a significantly positive effect on national innovative performance.

=== Seven system functions ===
As an example, the seven system functions defined by Hekkert are explained here:

- F1. Entrepreneurial activities: The classic role of the entrepreneur is to translate knowledge into business opportunities, and eventually innovations. The entrepreneur does this by performing market-oriented experiments that establish change, both to the emerging technology and to the institutions that surround it. The Entrepreneurial Activities involve projects aimed to prove the usefulness of the emerging technology in a practical and/or commercial environment. Such projects typically take the form of experiments and demonstrations.
- F2. Knowledge development: The Knowledge Development function involves learning activities, mostly on the emerging technology, but also on markets, networks, users etc. There are various types of learning activities, the most important categories being learning-by-searching and learning-by-doing. The former concerns R&D activities in basic science, whereas the latter involves learning activities in a practical context, for example in the form of laboratory experiments or adoption trials.
- F3. Knowledge diffusion / knowledge exchange through networks: The characteristic organization structure of a Technological Innovation System is that of the network. The primary function of networks is to facilitate the exchange of knowledge between all the actors involved in it. Knowledge Diffusion activities involve partnerships between actors, for example technology developers, but also meetings like workshops and conferences. The important role of Knowledge Diffusion stems from Lundvall's notion of interactive learning as the raison-d’être of any innovation system. The innovation system approach stresses that innovation happens only where actors of different backgrounds interact. A special form of interactive learning is learning-by-using, which involves learning activities based on the experience of users of technological innovations, for example through user-producer interactions.
- F4. Guidance of the search: The Guidance of the Search function refers to activities that shape the needs, requirements and expectations of actors with respect to their (further) support of the emerging technology. Guidance of the Search refers to individual choices related to the technology but it may also take the form of hard institutions, for example policy targets. It also refers to promises and expectations as expressed by various actors in the community. Guidance of the Search can be positive or negative. A positive Guidance of the Search means a convergence of positive signals - expectations, promises, policy directives - in a particular direction of technology development. If negative, there will be a digression, or, even worse, a rejection of development altogether. This convergence is important since, usually, various technological options exist within an emerging technological field, all of which require investments in order to develop further. Since resources are usually limited, it is important that specific foci are chosen. After all, without any focus there will be a dilution of resources, preventing all options from prospering. On the other hand, too much focus may result in the loss of variety. A healthy Technological Innovation System will strike a balance between creating and reducing variety.
- F5. Market formation: Emerging technologies cannot be expected to compete with incumbent technologies. In order to stimulate innovation, it is usually necessary to create artificial (niche) markets. The Market Formation function involves activities that contribute to the creation of a demand for the emerging technology, for example by financially supporting the use of the emerging technology, or by taxing the use of competing technologies. Market Formation is especially important in the field of sustainable energy technologies, since, in this case, there usually is a strong normative legitimation for the intervention in market dynamics.
- F6. Resource mobilization: Resource Mobilization refers to the allocation of financial, material and human capital. The access to such capital factors is necessary for all other developments. Typical activities involved in this system function are investments and subsidies. They can also involve the deployment of generic infrastructures such as educational systems, large R&D facilities or refueling infrastructures. In some cases, the mobilization of natural resources, such as biomass, oil or natural gas is important as well. The Resource Mobilization function represents a basic economic variable. Its importance is obvious: an emerging technology cannot be supported in any way if there are no financial or natural means, or if there are no actors present with the right skills and competences.
- F7. Support from advocacy coalitions: The rise of an emerging technology often leads to resistance from actors with interests in the incumbent energy system. In order for a Technological Innovation System to develop, other actors must counteract this inertia. This can be done by urging authorities to reorganize the institutional configuration of the system. The Support from Advocacy Coalitions function involves political lobbies and advice activities on behalf of interest groups. This system function may be regarded as a special form of Guidance of the Search. After all, lobbies and advices are pleas in favor of particular technologies. The essential feature which sets this category apart is that advocacy coalitions do not have the power, like for example governments, to change formal institutions directly. Instead, they employ the power of persuasion. The notion of the advocacy coalition is based on the work of Sabatier, who introduced the idea within the context of political science. The concept stresses the idea that structural change within a system is the outcome of competing interest groups, each representing a separate system of values and ideas. The outcome is determined by political power.

=== Cumulative causation ===
Since Carlsson and Stankiewicz introduced the concept of a Technological Innovation System, an increasing number of scholars have started focusing on dynamics. A recurring theme within their studies has been the notion of cumulative causation, closely related to the idea of a virtuous circle or vicious circle, by Gunnar Myrdal.

In this context, cumulative causation is the phenomenon that the build-up of a Technological Innovation System accelerates due to system functions interacting and reinforcing each other over time. For example, the successful realization of a research project, contributing to Knowledge Development, may result in high expectations, contributing to Guidance of the Search, among policy makers, which may, subsequently, trigger the start-up of a subsidy program, contributing to Resource Mobilization, which induces even more research activities: Knowledge Development, Guidance of the Search, etc. System functions may also reinforce each other ‘downwards’. In that case interactions result in conflicting developments or a vicious circle! Recently scholars have increasingly paid attention to the question of how cumulative causation may be established, often with a particular focus on the development of sustainable energy technologies.

=== Acquiring new technologies and capabilities ===
To improve competitiveness and retain sustainability, firms require new technologies and capabilities. In this age of rapid innovation and complexity, it is challenging for the firms to develop internally and remain competitive at the same time. Merger, acquisition and alliance are some of the ways to achieve this, but the primary driver is the desire to obtain valuable resources. Many acquisitions failed to achieve their objectives and resulted in poor performance because of improper implementation.

1. Improper documentation and changing implicit knowledge makes it difficult to share information during acquisition.

2. For acquired firm symbolic and cultural independence which is the base of technology and capabilities are more important than administrative independence.

3. Detailed knowledge exchange and integrations are difficult when the acquired firm is large and high performing.

4. Management of executives from acquired firm is critical in terms of promotions and pay incentives to utilize their talent and value their expertise.

5. Transfer of technologies and capabilities are most difficult task to manage because of complications of acquisition implementation. The risk of losing implicit knowledge is always associated with the fast pace acquisition.

Preservation of tacit knowledge, employees, and literature are factors during and after acquisition. Strategic management of these resources is a factor in an acquisition.

Increase in acquisitions in our global business environment emphasize evaluation of key stake holders of these acquisitions before implementation. It is imperative for acquirers to understand this relationship and apply its advantages. Retention is only possible when resources are exchanged and managed without affecting their independence.

== See also ==
- Technological innovation
- Relational capital
- Technological transitions
