= Technological transitions =

Describes how technological innovations occur and are incorporated into society

Technological transitions (TT) can best be described as a collection of theories regarding how technological innovations occur, the driving forces behind them, and how they are incorporated into society. TT draws on a number of fields, including history of science, technology studies, and evolutionary economics. Alongside the technological advancement, TT considers wider societal changes such as "user practices, regulation, industrial networks (supply, production, distribution), infrastructure, and symbolic meaning or culture". Hughes refers to the 'seamless web' where physical artifacts, organizations, scientific communities, and social practices combine. A technological transition occurs when there is a major shift in these socio-technical configurations.

== Origins ==
Work on technological transitions draws on a number of fields including history of science, technology studies, and evolutionary economics. The focus of evolutionary economics is on economic change, but as a driver of this technological change has been considered in the literature. Joseph Schumpeter, in his classic Theory of Economic Development placed the emphasis on non-economic forces as the driver for growth. The human actor, the entrepreneur is seen as the cause of economic development which occurs as a cyclical process. Schumpeter proposed that radical innovations were the catalyst for Kondratiev cycles.

=== Long wave theory ===
The Russian economist Kondratiev proposed that economic growth operated in boom and bust cycles of approximately 50 year periods. These cycles were characterised by periods of expansion, stagnation and recession. The period of expansion is associated with the introduction of a new technology, e.g. steam power or the microprocessor. At the time of publication, Kondratiev had considered that two cycles had occurred in the nineteenth century and third was beginning at the turn of the twentieth. Modern writers, such as Freeman and Perez outlined five cycles in the modern age:

- The Industrial Revolution (1770–1830)
- Victorian Prosperity: Age of steam and Rail (1830–1880)
- The Age of Steel (1880–1930)
- Oil, Mass Production and the Consumer Society (1930–1980)
- The Information Age (1980-?)

Freeman and Perez proposed that each cycle consists of pervasive technologies, their production and economic structures that support them. Termed 'techno-economic paradigms', they suggest that the shift from one paradigm to another is the result of emergent new technologies.

After the 2008 financial crisis, authors such as Moody and Nogrady have suggested that a new cycle is emerging from the old, centred on the use of sustainable technologies in a resource depleted world.

=== Technological paradigms, trajectories and regimes ===
Thomas Kuhn described how a paradigm shift is a wholesale shift in the basic understanding of a scientific theory. Examples in science include the change of thought from miasma to germ theory as a cause of disease. Building on this work, Giovanni Dosi developed the concept of 'technical paradigms' and 'technological trajectories'. In considering how engineers work, the technical paradigm is an outlook on the technological problem, a definition of what the problems and solutions are. It charts the idea of specific progress. By identifying the problems to be solved the paradigm exerts an influence on technological change. The pattern of problem solving activity and the direction of progress is the technological trajectory. In similar fashion, Nelson and Winter (,)defined the concept of the 'technological regime' which directs technological change through the beliefs of engineers of what problems to solve. The work of the actors and organisations is the result of organisational and cognitive routines which determines search behaviour. This places boundaries and also trajectories (direction) to those boundaries.

== Multi-level perspective (MLP) on technological transitions ==
=== Socio-technical systems and transitions ===
Recently, the scope of academic sustainability discourse and investigative focus has broadened beyond the study of technological products, innovations and subsequent transitions. Much of the literature now examines technological artefacts and innovations through a wider scope of socio-technical systems. It has been argued that this contemporary framework has emerged in response to both an increased understanding of the urgency of environmental problems and the recognition that more substantiative transitions are required across multiple interdependent systems to mitigate impacts.

The technological transitions framework does acknowledge the co-evolution and mutual unfolding of societal change alongside technological innovation. However, the socio-technical transitions framework considers a more encompassing view of the interdependent links that technology maintains with systems that both generate the need for new innovations and ultimately produce and maintain them. More specifically, the systems that comprise the socio-technical paradigm include technology, supply networks, infrastructure, maintenance networks, regulation, cultural meaning as well as user practices and markets. As such, socio-technical transitions can be defined as the multi-dimensional shift from one socio-technical system to another involving changes in both technological and social systems that are intrinsically linked in a feedback loop. Generally speaking, socio-technical transitions are a slow process as technological innovation tends to occur incrementally along fixed trajectories due to the rigidity of economic, social, cultural, infrastructural and regulative norms. This is referred to as path dependency, creating technological 'lock-ins' which prevent innovation that disrupts the status quo. Therefore, the breakthrough and dissemination of technological innovations is dependent on more than their respective benefits, providing an insight into the complexity of the forces and multiple dimensions at play.

=== Multi-level perspective (MLP) framework ===
The multi-level perspective (MLP) is an analytical tool that attempts to deal with this complexity and resistance to change. Focussing on the dynamics of wider transitionary developments as opposed to discrete technological innovations, the MLP concerns itself with socio-technical system transformations, particularly with transitions towards sustainability and resilience. As the name implies, the MLP posits three analytical and heuristic levels on which processes interact and align to result in socio-technical system transformations; landscape (macro-level), regimes (meso-level) and niches (micro-level). Firstly, the regime level represents the current structures and practices characterised by dominant rules, institutions and technologies that are self-reinforcing. The socio-technical regime is dynamically stable in the sense that innovation still transpires albeit incrementally and along a predictable trajectory. This makes the regime 'locked-in' and resistant to both technological and social transitions. Secondly, the landscape level is defined as the exogenous, broader contextual developments in deep-seated cultural patterns, macro-economics, macro-politics and spatial structures, potentially arising from shocks associated with wars, economic crisis, natural disaster and political upheaval. Additionally, landscapes are beyond the direct influence of actors, yet stimulate and exert pressure on them at the regime and niche levels. Finally, the niche is defined as the "locus for radical innovations" where dedicated actors nurture the development of technological novelties. Incubated from market and regulation influences, the niche fosters innovations that differ fundamentally from the prevailing regime and usually require landscape developments that open windows of opportunity in at the regime level. Therefore, the MLP attributes socio-technical transitions to the interaction of stabilising forces at the regime level with destabilising forces from both the landscape and niche levels.

=== MLP application - automobility regime ===
Due to the systems approach inherent in the MLP, analysis can be approached from different disciplinary perspectives according to their respective ontologies and priorities. From an urban planning perspective, the framework could be used to pinpoint the barriers and drivers associated with low carbon transport systems to better target policy efforts. To begin, from an urban mobility perspective, the landscape level is currently pressured by both stabilising and destabilising pressures. Namely, Peak Oil, public concern surrounding inaction towards climate change mitigation and information technologies that digitise daily life (e.g. tele-commuting) destabilises the landscape and automobility regime. Conversely, the landscape level is solidified by stabilising forces such as cultural preferences for private ownership, timesaving, autonomy and privacy, as well as car-favouring urban fabric and infrastructure. This is further enhanced by universal pressures of globalisation which presupposes urban mobility to increase flows of goods and people.

This tension between stabilising and destabilising forces is mirrored in the prevailing automobility regime. The regime is stabilised by persistent investment in road projects, lifestyle norms and consumer preferences that perpetuate car use and resistance to major change by vested actors such as transport planners, policy makers and industry actors (e.g. car manufactures). Despite this stability, shifts in the landscape has allowed "cracks" in the regime such as traffic management policy (traffic calming, parking restrictions, etc.), diminishing policy commitment to the regime and industry actors proclaiming awareness of landscape pressures associated with climate change

In these contexts, niche socio-technical innovations that challenge the assumptions and norms of the regime have been birthed, mainly in the form of local policy and infrastructure initiatives on a city-scale. For example, intermodal travel in the form of bus/bike-rail integration schemes, bike rental/sharing have been trialled in many cities globally. Also, niche sustainable urban planning concepts such as compact cities, smart growth and transit-oriented development have modestly emerged into sustainably mobility discourse. However, the persistence of the automobility regime due to the general stability of the landscape has resulted in limited, small-scale implementations of these niche innovations. As such, prevailing user preference and cultural values at the landscape level appear to be a major barrier in transport system socio-technical transitions, as they stabilise the automobility regime, disallowing niche innovations to gain a foothold.

== Transition paths ==
The nature of transitions varies and the differing qualities result in multiple pathways occurring. Geels and Schot defined five transition paths:

- Reproduction: Ongoing change occurring in the regime level.
- Transformation: A socio-technical regime that changes without the emergence of a monopolising technology.
- Technological substitution: An incumbent technology is replaced by a radical innovation resulting in a new socio-technical regime.
- De-alignment and Re-alignment: Weaknesses in the regime sees the advent of competing new technologies leading to a dominant model. (E.g. the automobile replacing the horse as the primary means of land transport).
- Re-configuration: When multiple, interlinked technologies are replaced by a similarly linked alternative set.

== Characteristics of technological transitions ==
Six characteristics of technological transitions have been identified.,

Transitions are co-evolutionary and multi-dimensional Technological developments occur intertwined with societal needs, wants and uses. A technology is adopted and diffused based on this interplay between innovation and societal requirements. Co-evolution has different aspects. As well as the co-evolution of technology and society, aspects between science, technology, users and culture have been considered.

Multi-actors are involved Scientific and engineering communities are central to the development of a technology, but a wide range of actors are involved in a transition. This can include organisations, policy-makers, government, NGOs, special interest groups and others.

Transitions occur at multiple levels As shown in the MLP, transitions occur through the interplay of processes at different levels.

Transitions are a long-term process Complete system-change takes time and can be decades in the making. Case studies show them to be between 40 and 90 years.

Transitions are radical For a true transition to occur the technology has to be a radical innovation.

Change is Non-linear The rate of change will vary over time. For example, the pace of change may be slow at the gestation period (at the niche level) but much more rapid when a breakthrough is occurring.

== Diffusion: transition phases ==
Diffusion of an innovation is the concept of how it is picked up by society, at what rate and why. The diffusion of a technological innovation into society can be considered in distinct phases. Pre-development is the gestation period where the new technology has yet to make an impact. Take-off is when the process of a system shift is beginning. A breakthrough is occurring when fundamental changes are occurring in existing structures through the interplay of economic, social and cultural forces. Once the rate of change has decreased and a new balance is achieved, stabilization is said to have occurred. A full transition involves an overhaul of existing rules and change of beliefs which takes time, typically spanning at least a generation. This process can be speeded up through seismic, unforeseen events such as war or economic strife.

Geels proposed a similar four-phase approach which draws on the multi-level perspective (MLP) developed by Dutch scholars. Phase one sees the emergence of a novelty, born from the existing regime. Development then occurs in the niche level at phase two. As before, breakthrough then occurs at phase three. In the parlance of the MLP the new technology, having been developed at the niche level, is in competition with the established regime. To break through and achieve wide diffusion, external factors – 'windows of opportunity' – are required.

== Windows of opportunity ==
A number of possible circumstances can act as windows of opportunity for the diffusion of new technologies:

- Internal technical problems in the existing regime. Those that cannot be solved by refinement of existing technologies act as a driver for the new.
- Problems external to the system. Such 'problems' are often determined by pressure groups and require wider societal or political backing. An example is environmental concerns.
- Changing user preferences. Opportunities are presented if existing technologies cannot meet user needs.
- Strategic advantage. Competition with rivals may necessitate innovation
- Complementary technology. The availability of which may enable a breakthrough

Alongside external influences, internal drivers catalyse diffusion. These include economic factors such as the price performance ration. Socio-technical perspectives focus on the links between disparate social and technological elements. Following the breakthrough, the final phases see the new technology supersede the old.

== Societal relevance ==
The study of technological transitions has an impact beyond academic interest. The transitions referred to in the literature may relate to historic processes, such as the transportation transitions studied by Geels, but system changes are required to achieve a safe transition to a low-carbon economy.. Current structural problems are apparent in a range of sectors. Dependency on oil is problematic in the energy sector due to availability, access and contribution to greenhouse gas (GHG) emissions. Transportation is a major user of energy causing significant emission of GHGs. Food production will need to keep pace with an ever-growing world population while overcoming challenges presented by global warming and transportation issues. Incremental change has provided some improvements but a more radical transition is required to achieve a more sustainable future.

Developed from the work on technological transitions is the field of transition management. Within this is an attempt to shape the direction of change complex socio-technical systems to more sustainable patterns. Whereas work on technological transitions is largely based on historic processes, proponents of transition management seek to actively steer transitions in progress.

== Criticisms ==
Genus and Coles outlined a number of criticisms against the analysis of technological transitions, in particular when using the MLP. Empirical research on technological transitions occurring now has been limited, with the focus on historic transitions. Depending on the perspective on transition case studies they could be presented as having occurred on a different transition path to what was shown. For example, the bicycle could be considered an intermediate transport technology between the horse and the car. Judged from shorter different time-frame this could appear a transition in its own right. Determining the nature of a transition is problematic; when it started and ended, or whether one occurred in the sense of a radical innovation displacing an existing socio-technical regime. The perception of time casts doubt on whether a transition has occurred. If viewed over a long enough period even inert regimes may demonstrate radical change in the end. The MLP has also been criticised by scholars studying sustainability transitions using Social Practice Theories.

== See also ==
- Evolutionary economics
- Kondratiev wave
- Technological change
- Technological innovation system
- Technology policy
- Technological revolution
- Transition Management (Governance)
