= Triple helix model of innovation =

Theory of interactions between academia, industry, and government

The triple helix model of innovation refers to a set of interactions between academia (the university), industry and government, to foster economic and social development, as described in concepts such as the knowledge economy and knowledge society. In innovation helical framework theory, each sector is represented by a circle (helix), with overlapping showing interactions. The initial modelling has advanced from two dimensions to show more complex interactions, for example over time. The framework was first theorized by Henry Etzkowitz and Loet Leydesdorff in the 1990s, with the publication of "The Triple Helix, University-Industry-Government Relations: A laboratory for Knowledge-Based Economic Development". Interactions between universities, industries and governments have given rise to new intermediary institutions, such as technology transfer offices and science parks, and Etzkowitz and Ledersdorff theorized the relationship between the three sectors and explained the emergence of these new hybrid organizations. The triple helix innovation framework has been widely adopted and as applied by policy makers has participated in the transformation of each sector.

== Three components of the model ==
The triple helix model of innovation, as theorized by Etzkowitz and Leydesdorff, is based on the interactions between the three following elements and their associated 'initial role': universities engaging in basic research, industries producing commercial goods and governments that are regulating markets. As interactions increase within this framework, each component evolves to adopt some characteristics of the other institution, which then gives rise to hybrid institutions. Within the Triple Helix framework, bilateral interactions occur between pairs of institutional spheres (university–industry, university–government, and industry–government), whereas trilateral interactions involve the joint participation of universities, industry, and government.

=== University-industry interactions ===
Etzkowitz and Leydesdorff argue that the initial role of universities is to provide education to individuals and basic research. Therefore, interactions between university and industry revolve initially around those two elements. In a linear model of innovation, universities are supposed to provide the research which industry will build upon to produce commercial goods. The other interactions take place through the involvement of industry managers and university faculty in both sectors. According to Etzkowitz, the transfer of people between university and industry constitutes a very important transfer of knowledge. This can be a permanent move in one direction or the other, or in other cases, entire careers spent between the two spheres. He gives the example of Carl Djerassi, a research director for a pharmaceutical company who joined Stanford University while continuing his industrial activity.

However, other scholars have pointed out that consulting activities of faculty members could also have drawbacks, like a reduced focus on educating the students, and potential conflict of interests relating to the use of university resources for the benefit of industry. Additional transfer of knowledge between university and industry happens through informal communication, conferences or industrial interest in university publications. Another type of interaction, for example, is the creation of co-op programs like the MIT-General Electric course which aims at integrating an industry approach into the students' curricula.

=== University-government interactions ===
The strength of the interactions between the government and universities depends on the government's general relationship to and policy towards higher education. Etzkowitz and Leydesdorff's model uses a spectrum to define the extent of these interactions. On the one hand, when higher education is largely public, as in continental western Europe, the government has a higher influence on universities and the research they conduct by being the main source of funding. On the other end of the spectrum, typically associated with the United States, universities still receive some government funding but overall have a higher degree of independence from government influence. However, the two ends of this spectrum are used as ideal-types that are not necessarily reflective of the reality. The changing circumstances can push the government to create closer ties with academia, for example in wartime, and/or through funding of strategic disciplines, like physics. For example, in the United States, the Department of Defense has extensively funded physics research during World War II and the Cold War. Another example of state involvement in higher education is the establishment of new universities, as through the Morrill Land-Grant Acts of 1862 encouraging the creation of land-grant colleges. Cornell University, the University of Florida and Purdue University are three of the seventy-six institutions created under the land-grant.

=== Government-industry interactions ===
The relationship between governments and industry depends on the government's attitude towards the market. In liberal economies the role of the government will be limited to preventing market failures. On the other hand, where the government is more involved in the economy, the government's role is the regulation of the industry. These are also two ends of a spectrum, leaving room for substantial variation, based on circumstances and disciplines. For example, as pointed out by Bhaven Sampat, in the 1960s, the government created a regulation to prevent patenting by or licensing to industry of university research funded by the National Institutes of Health. One key role of the government in its interaction with industry is the establishment of intellectual property law and its enforcement.

=== Strength of interaction ===
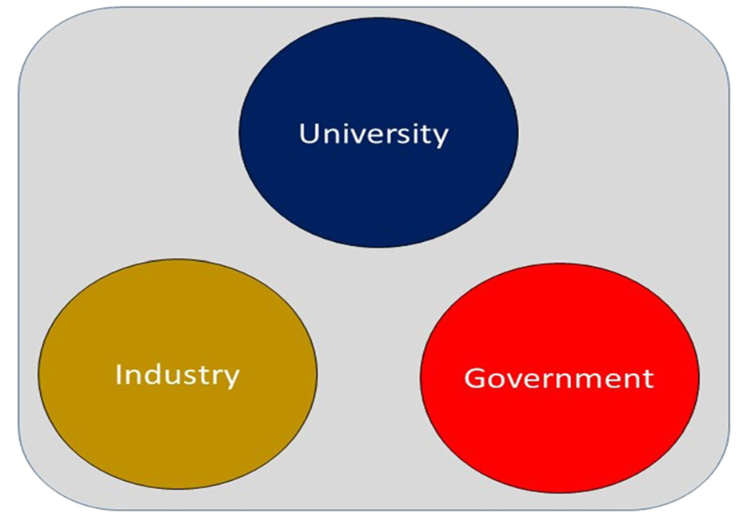
Figure 1:Triple Helix Interactions in a Developing Country (Silo Confinement)

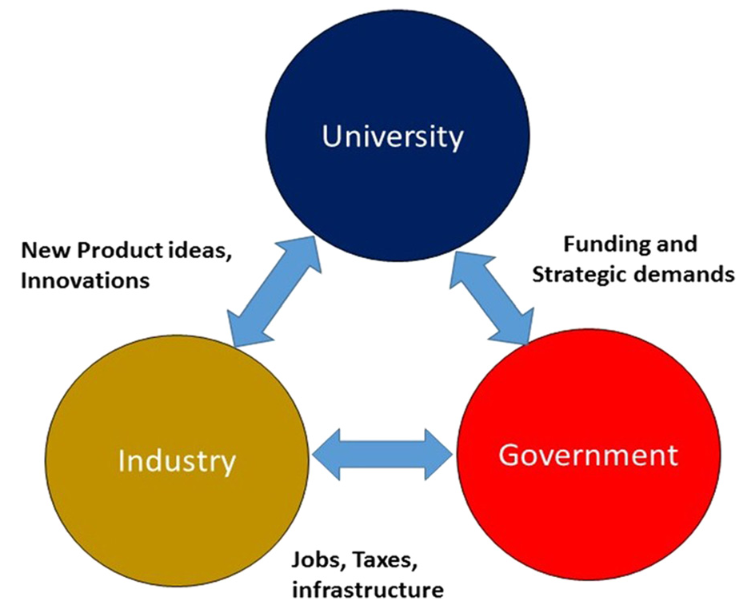
Figure 2:Beginning of Triple Helix Strategic Interactions in a Middle Income Country (Push-Pull)

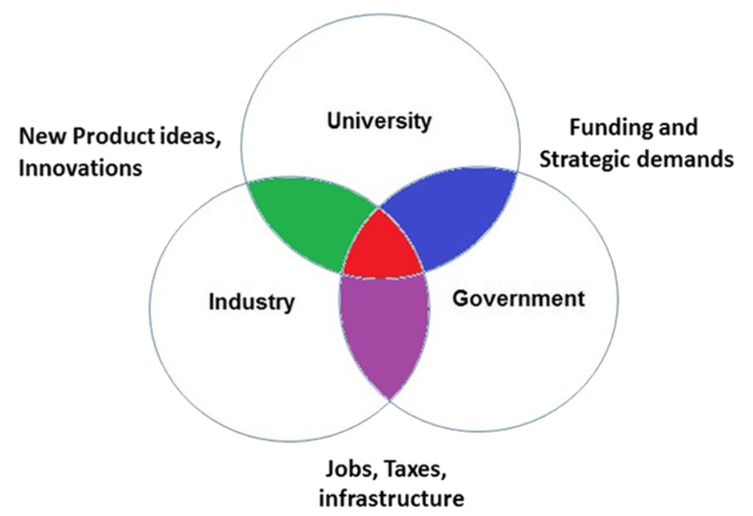
Figure 3:Triple Helix Strategic Interactions in a Developed Country (Red Indicates Science Park)

Etzkowitz and Leydesdorff initially argued that the strength of the interactions between governments, industry and university depends on which component is the driving force in the framework. In a statist model, a strong state is driving interactions between the three components in a top-down implementation. It creates stronger ties and a more integrated model. In a laissez-faire model, in which the industry and market forces are the leading forces, the ties are weaker and each institution tends to remain very independent. However, the distinction between the two models is not always clear cut, as the government can choose to adopt a strong or a weak stance depending on the context and the industry. Strength of interactions can also vary according to the development of a country, with a silo model predominating in an underdeveloped country, moderate interactions developing in a middle-income country due to the push for economic growth on the one hand and the pull for a competitive market-driven technological advancement on the other, and strong interactions developing in a developed country, for example in the form of a science park. In a recent paper, Etzkowitz emphasized that the shift towards a knowledge-based society has given a bigger role to universities. Indeed, as innovation is increasingly based on scientific knowledge, the role of universities as creators of knowledge is more valued. As a result, he argues that university, industry and government are more equal, and that no particular element is necessarily the driving force of the triple helix model of innovation.

== Evolution and hybridization ==
The triple helix model of innovation also blurred the boundaries of the traditional basic roles of university, industry and government. According to Etzkowitz and Leydesdorff, this marks the second step in the triple helix of innovation framework. For example, universities increasingly take part in commercial activity through patenting and licensing, moving beyond the production of basic research. The next step is the emergence of intermediaries between the three elements as well as the hybridization of the three entities. Nevertheless, each entity retains a strong primacy in its original field of expertise: the university remains the main source of knowledge production, industry is the primary vehicle of commercialization and the government retains its regulatory role.

Technology transfer offices have been established by universities to foster the transformation of university basic or applied research with a commercial value into commercial goods. One of the aims of TTOs is to create some revenues for the university, thus enhancing its role as an economic actor. However, the average profitability of TTOs remains very low. For example, the revenues earned through the licensing of patents by TTOs in American universities are, on average, ten times larger than for European TTOs according to the Innovation Policy Platform. Science parks have also emerged as the result of the collaboration of industries and universities with the government. They can stem from the initiative of an industrial region to modernize itself with the impulse of a university. On the other hand, they can be the result of a university initiative to attract industry, as was the case with the development of Stanford's science park around the university or the Research Triangle in North Carolina.

The 'entrepreneurial university' is another hybrid element which Etzkowitz defines around the following elements: the capitalization of knowledge, strong ties with industry and governments, a high degree of independence, and permanent evolution of the relationships between universities, industry and government. Etzkowitz recognizes MIT as a great example of an 'entrepreneurial university'.

== Extensions of the model ==
=== Quadruple helix model ===
Building on the triple helix model, the quadruple helix model adds a fourth component to the framework of interactions between university, industry and government: the public, consisting of civil society and the media. It was first suggested in 2009 by Elias G. Carayannis and David F.J. Campbell. The framework aims to bridge the gaps between innovation and civil society, and it claims that under the triple helix model, the emerging technologies do not always match the demands and needs of society, thus limiting their potential impact. The framework consequently emphasizes a societal responsibility of universities, in addition to their role of educating and conducting research. The quadruple helix is the approach that the European Union has intended to take for the development of a competitive knowledge-based society. Subsequently, the quadruple helix has been applied to European Union-sponsored projects and policies, including the EU-MACS (EUropean MArket for Climate Services) project, a follow-up project of the European Research and Innovation Roadmap for Climate Services, and the European Commission's Open Innovation 2.0 (OI2) policy for a digital single market that supports open innovation.

=== Quintuple helix model ===
The quintuple helix model was co-developed by Elias G. Carayannis and David F.J. Campbell in 2010. It is based on the triple and quadruple helix models and adds as fifth helix the natural environment. The quintuple helix views the natural environments of society and the economy as drivers for knowledge production and innovation, thus defining socio-ecological opportunities for the knowledge society and knowledge economy, such as innovation to address sustainable development, including climate change. The quintuple helix can be described in terms of the models of knowledge that it extends, the five subsystems (helices) it incorporates, and the steps involved in the circulation of knowledge. How to define both the quadruple and quintuple helices has been debated, and some researchers see them as additional helices, while others see them as different types of helix which overarch the previous helices.

== Triple helix and policy making ==
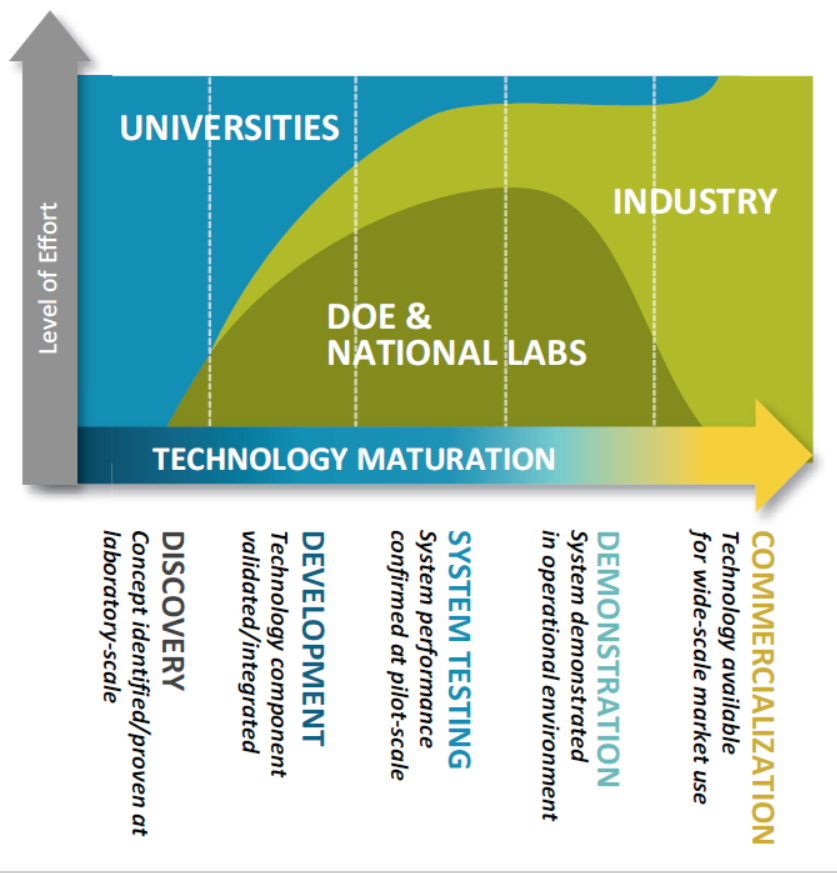
Figure 4: DOE National Laboratories' Relationship to Universities and Industry in the Energy Innovation System

The triple helix model has been used as a lens through which evolving relationships between university, industry and government can be analyzed. However, according to Etzkowitz and Leydesdorff, it can also be a policy making tool. It has been applied for both purposes by government organizations, such as the United States Department of Energy. Etzkowitz argues that after the end of the Soviet Era, triple helix inspired policies were implemented in Eastern Europe to promote their growth. In Sweden, the triple helix policy aimed at tying together innovation initiatives at different scales to increase their overall efficiency. The triple helix model has also been applied to developing countries and regions.

=== Criticism of the model ===
The triple helix model as a policy-making tool for economic growth and regional development has been criticized by many scholars. One main criticism is that Etzkowitz and Leydesdorff's framework was developed within Western developed countries, which means that it is based on a particular set of infrastructures and under circumstances. For example, the model takes for granted that knowledge intensive activities are linked to economic growth, that intellectual property rights will be protected, and that the state has a democratic and market oriented culture. Further scholarly criticism of the model focuses on the conditions that enable the implementation of a triple helix innovation policy. It argues that Etzkowitz and Leydesdorff's model is too vague and takes for granted those necessary preconditions within their model. Therefore, according to critics, the triple helix model is not a relevant policy making tool for developing countries where at least one of these conditions is missing. However, others have argued that the triple helix model is capable of both describing the situation in developing countries and is useful for planning policy.

== See also ==
- Innovation economics
- Innovation system
- Knowledge economy
- Knowledge society
- Linear model of innovation
- Quadruple and quintuple innovation helix framework
