= Local innovation system =

A local innovation system is a spatial concentration of firms (including specialized suppliers of equipment and services and customers) and associated non-market institutions (universities, research institutes, training institutions, standard-setting bodies, local trade associations, regulatory agencies, technology transfer agencies, business associations, relevant government agencies and departments, et al.) that combine to create new products and/or services in specific lines of business.

The idea of a local innovation system is an adaptation from the concepts of the national innovation system (original concept) and regional innovation system.

== See also ==
- Regional innovation system
- National innovation system
