= Social Science Information =

- Discipline: Social sciences
- Language: English, French
- Edited by: Anne Rocha Perazzo

Publication details
- Former name: International Social Science Council Information (until 1962)
- History: 1962-present
- Publisher: SAGE Publications
- Frequency: Quarterly
- Impact factor: 0.550 (2010)

Standard abbreviations
- ISO 4: Soc. Sci. Inf.

Indexing
- CODEN: SSCIBL
- ISSN: 0539-0184 (print); 1461-7412 (web)
- LCCN: 86649437
- OCLC no.: 44689977

Links
- Journal homepage; Online access; Online archive

Social Science Information/Information sur les sciences sociales is a peer-reviewed academic journal that covers social science. The journal's editor-in-chief is Anne Rocha Perazzo (School for Advanced Studies in the Social Sciences). It was established in 1962 and is currently published by SAGE Publications on behalf of the Fondation Maison des Sciences de l'Homme. The journal publishes articles in both English and French.

== Abstracting and indexing ==
The journal is abstracted and indexed in Scopus and the Social Sciences Citation Index. According to the Journal Citation Reports, its 2010 impact factor is 0.550, ranking it 48 out of 77 journals in the category "Information Science & Library Science" and 51 out of 83 journals in the category "Social Sciences, Interdisciplinary".
