= Neural (magazine) =

Italian magazine

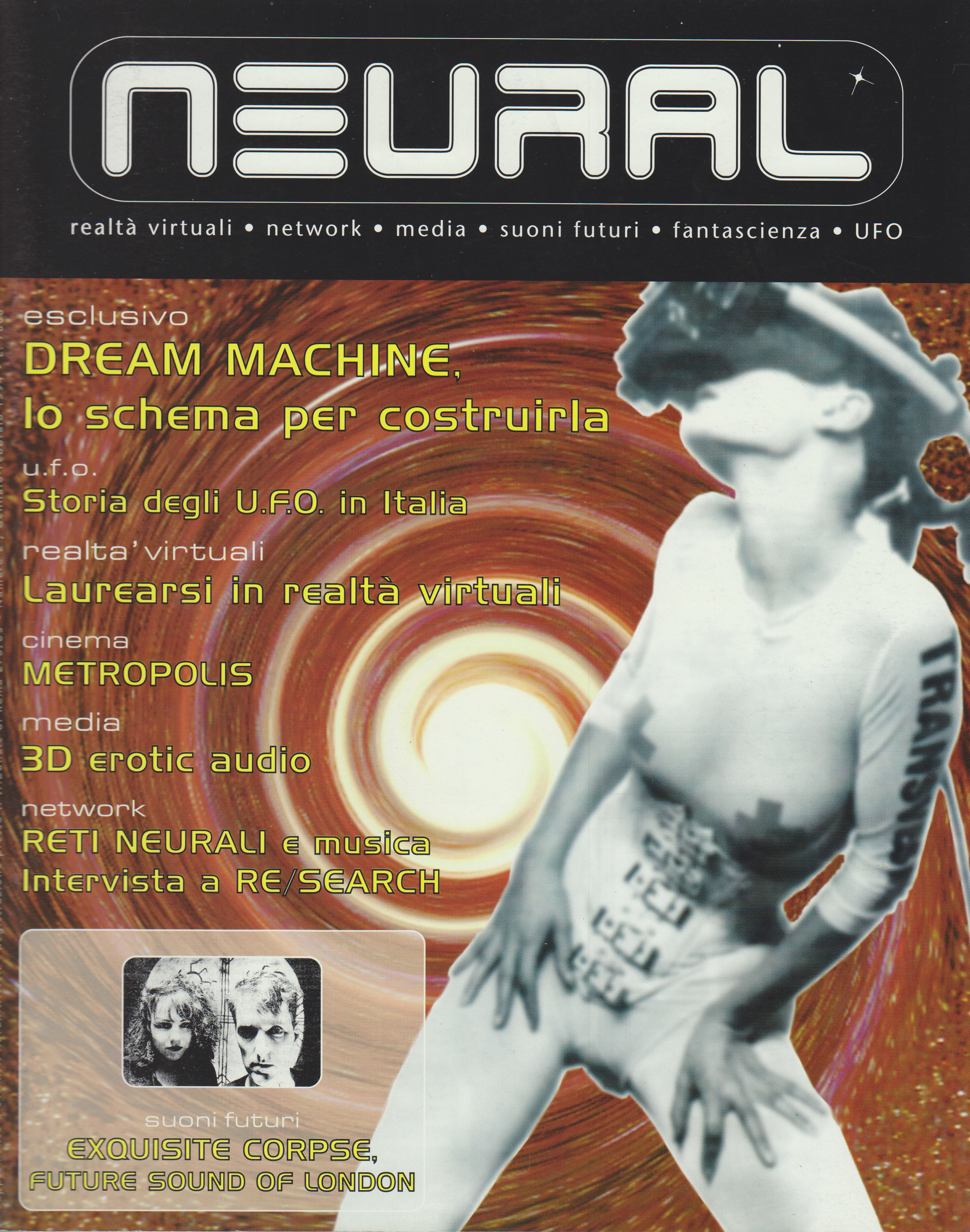
- Cover of Issue #2: Dream Machine
- Chief Editor: Alessandro Ludovico
- Assistant Editor: Aurelio Cianciotta Mendizza
- English Editor: Rachel O'Dwyer
- Staff writers: Josephine Bosma; Chiara Ciociola; Daphne Dragona; Rachel O'Dwyer; Paolo Pedercini; Paul Prudence; Benedetta Sabatini
- Categories: New Media Art, Electronic Music, Hacktivism
- Founder: Alessandro Ludovico; Ivan Iusco
- Founded: 1993
- First issue: November 1993
- Country: Italy
- Based in: Bari
- Language: English, Italian
- Website: neural.it
- ISSN: 2037-108X

Neural is an Italian magazine focusing on new media art, electronic music and hacktivism. It was founded in Bari in 1993 by Alessandro Ludovico and Ivan Iusco and initially published in Italian. The first issue, published in November 1993, included an Italian translation of William Gibson's Agrippa (A Book of the Dead). The magazine developed out of the early-1990s cyberpunk and network-culture milieu and later became associated with international discussions of net art, digital culture and critical approaches to technology.

An English-language edition was introduced in 2003. Neural has participated in international publishing and art networks including Mag.net and the Documenta 12 magazines project, and received an honorary mention in the Net Vision / Net Excellence category of the Prix Ars Electronica in 2004.

== History ==
The first topics covered were: cyberpunk (both as a literary and political movement), electronic music, computer networks and bulletin board systems (BBS), virtual reality, media, science fiction and unidentified flying objects (UFOs). The magazine's mission was to be a magazine of ideas, becoming a node in a larger network of digital culture publishers. The magazine was also committed to give its topics a proper visual frame: focusing on graphic design and how it could have expressed the electronic culture in a sort of printed 'interface', exploiting at the same time the "sensorial" possibilities of the printed page. So, for example the page numbering was strictly in binary numbers for three years, then decimal figures were added aside. There was a department with stereogram pictures and the centerfold hosted a few optical art artworks. The graphic design included a fixed space in every article for contact and links, being inspired by the Whole Earth Catalog experiments.

Tatiana Bazzichelli describes Neural as one of the main Italian magazines devoted to new media culture and electronic music, and notes its role in bringing Italian experimental work to an international audience while reporting on developments abroad. Domenico Quaranta later noted that the magazine gained increasing international credibility through its website, its English-language print edition and the international networking of its founder, Alessandro Ludovico.

In 1997 the first Neural website was established, and it has been updated daily since September 2000. The Neural website is bi-lingual (English and Italian).

In 1998, the topics were restricted to three: media art, with a peculiar attention to the networked and conceptual use of technology in art (the so-called net.art), hacktivism, or activism using electronic media to express itself and electronic music, investigating how the technology is involved in music production, consumption and experimentation.

In May 2002, Neural was one of the founding members of Mag.net, electronic cultural publishers, an international network of magazines, whose slogan is "Collaboration is Better than Competition". This network was founded during the conference and workshop "Post Media Publishing" that took place at the Universidad International de Andalucia, in Seville (Spain). Since then, a few Mag.net meetings, mutual workshops and presentations were done in various countries, and three Mag.net Readers were published as well.

In 2007, Neural was part of the Documenta 12 magazines project and Alessandro Ludovico was appointed as an advisor.

In 2008, Neural celebrated 15 years of publishing with a joint micro-printed action with Swamp group.

Neural magazine (ISSN 2037-108X) started as a bi-monthly but since 1997 it was printed three times in a year (some years it was printed irregularly). It was printed originally in Italian, but since 2003 there were two different printed editions: in English and Italian. The Italian printed edition was discontinued in 2008.

== Publication history ==
Neural was originally published in Italian. An English-language edition was introduced in 2003, while the Italian print edition was later discontinued. The magazine has continued as an English-language print publication, with individual issues organized around thematic topics in digital culture, media art, electronic music and technology.

== Awards ==
Prix Ars Electronica has been awarded since 1987 by Ars Electronica, based in Linz, Austria, acknowledging excellent international initiatives and achievements in electronic and interactive art, computer animation, digital culture and music.

From 2001 to 2006, awards were given in the Net Vision / Net Excellence category. In 2004, Neural received an honorary mention in this category.

== Contributors ==
Contributors who wrote for Neural include Josephine Bosma, Jonah Brucker-Cohen, Bronac Ferran, Daphne Dragona, and Paul Prudence.
