= Regional innovation system =

In the study of innovation systems, a regional innovation system (RIS) encourages the rapid diffusion of knowledge, skills and best practice within a geographic area larger than a city, but smaller than a nation. The edge of a regional innovation system may be drawn conceptually and organizationally around the economic, social, political and institutional relationships that generate a collective learning process within a related group of technological or functional areas.

A recent study has shown that innovation output is higher in regions where both a sizable population of small firms and large firms are present. In regions lacking large firms, universities can take on the important role of knowledge brokers for small and medium enterprises (SMEs).

In the European context, the European Union following a regional development model (dividing European territories in administrative and statistical national subdivisions) gives great emphasis to RIS. The regional innovation systems had been favoured especially after the setting of Lisbon's strategy goals. Now regional innovation policies had been incorporated in various larger or smaller EU initiatives and policy packages and large part of the investments by the EU structural funds is devoted to the creation or enhancement of the local-regional innovation systems.

Switzerland defines regional innovation systems (RIS) as "functional economic spaces – usually supracantonal and even cross-border in some cases – where networks of important actors for innovation processes, such as companies, research and education establishments, as well as public authorities". The Swiss New Regional Policy (NPR) influences the development of RIS since it supports the RIS governance and management, whose activities encompass services intended for start-up and SMEs: point of entry, networking platforms, cluster development and coaching.

The OECD focuses on regional innovation system as part of the Regional Development Policy Committee (RDPC) activities. It fosters best practices exchanges on this and regularly publishes reports on related issues (for example included in the Territorial Reviews). "Peer reviews provide analytic assessment and policy advice for regions, reviews examine the strength of the regional innovation system, the appropriateness of the policy mix for the region's needs, and the strategic use of the region's resources given global, national, regional and local factor. For countries, reviews assess the extent to which policies from different policy streams (e.g., regional development, science and technology, enterprise policy and higher education policy) are effective in building regional innovation systems and clusters for the range of region types in the country".

The RIS concept, which originated in European academic literature, has been used as an influential analytical tool in different Latin American countries. In Medellín, Colombia, the RIS concept has been adopted to support new technological trajectories. At the center of the RIS is the regional innovation agency, Ruta N.

Regional innovation agencies have been created in many regions around the world to support the innovation process in their RIS.

== See also ==
- Local innovation system
- National innovation system
