= Peter Scott (educationalist) =

British educationalist (born 1946)

Sir George Peter Scott FAcSS (born 1 August 1946) is a British educationalist and the former Vice-Chancellor of Kingston University in Kingston upon Thames in southwest London. He was knighted in 2007 for "services to education". In 2016 he was appointed the Fair Access Commissioner by the Scottish government, a role he held until 2023.

== Life and career ==
Scott studied modern history as an undergraduate at Merton College, Oxford and was a visiting scholar and at the University of California, Berkeley Graduate School of Public Policy under a Harkness Fellowship. He then worked as a leader writer for The Times, and began writing for the Times Higher Education Supplement in 1971. He went on to serve as its editor from 1976 until 1992 when he was appointed Professor of Education at the University of Leeds and Director the university's Centre for Policy Studies in Education. He also served as the university's Pro Vice-Chancellor from 1995 to 1997. He concurrently served on the Lord Chancellor's Advisory Committee on Legal Education and Conduct from 1994 to 2000, and later was the vice-chairman (and acting chairman during the interregnum between the resignation of Lord Steyn and the appointment of Lord Nicholls, both Law Lords).

Scott was appointed Vice-Chancellor of Kingston University in 1997 and took up his post there in January of the following year. He holds strong views about the need for administrators rather than academics to govern the activities of universities, calling administrators the "key profession" in higher education in his April 2009 speech to the annual conference of the Association of University Administrators. However, this speech was intended to recognise the growing importance of administrators in higher education, not to detract from the central role played by academic staff. In May of that same year the World Intellectual Property Organization rejected a complaint by Scott that an internet domain name—sirpeterscott.com—registered by a former Kingston University lecturer constituted a trademark owned by him (Scott) and that the lecturer did not have the right to use it. The lecturer was subsequently convicted of harassing Scott via the website; the conviction was later set aside, and he was acquitted in a re-trial.

Scott stepped down as Vice-Chancellor of Kingston at the end of 2010 (six months before he was due to retire) to become Professor of Higher Education Studies at the Institute of Education, University of London. He also writes on educational issues for The Guardian. From 2011 until 2015 Scott was Chair of Council at the University of Gloucestershire.

He was appointed Fair Access Commissioner by the Scottish government in 2016. His role was to report on the implementation of the recommendations of A Blueprint for Fairness, the final report of the Commission for Widening Access.

== Honours ==
Peter Scott was knighted in 2007 for "services to education". He is a member of Academia Europaea and the Academy of Social Sciences, and has received the following honorary degrees:

- Doctor of Laws (University of Bath, 1992)
- Doctor of Letters, University of Leicester
- Doctor of Letters, St George's University of London (now City St George's)
- Doctor of Letters (Council for National Academic Awards, at its last awards ceremony)
- Doctor of Philosophy (Anglia Polytechnic University, now Anglia Ruskin University)
- Doctor of Letters (Grand Valley State University, Grand Rapids, Michigan USA)
