= Elias G. Carayannis =

Greek-American economist

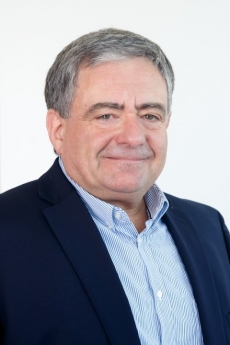
- Citizenship: United States; Greece
- Education: National Technical University of Athens; Rensselaer Polytechnic Institute
- Known for: Quintuple helix
- Scientific career
- Fields: Innovation economics
- Workplaces: George Washington University School of Business
- Website: https://business.gwu.edu/elias-g-carayannis

Elias G. Carayannis is a Greek-American economist who is presently a full Professor of Science, Technology, Innovation and Entrepreneurship at the George Washington University School of Business in Washington, D.C.

He is involved in the areas of "strategic government-university-industry R&D partnerships, technology road-mapping, technology transfer and commercialization, international science and technology policy, technological entrepreneurship and regional economic development". As an engineer with training in management, innovation and entrepreneurship studies, his career has spanned roles as scientist, technologist, innovation economist, and entrepreneur. Notably, in 1999 he became Director of Research on Science, Technology, Innovation and Entrepreneurship of the European Union Research Center (EURC) at the George Washington University School of Business. In 2004, he co-founded and became co-director of the George Washington University School of Business's Global and Entrepreneurial Finance Research Institute (GEFRI). He has published a number of books on entrepreneurialism and science and technology. Carayannis has become most recognized for his work in innovation economics, especially the quadruple helix and quintuple helix frameworks.

== Biography ==
=== Education ===
Carayannis earned a Bachelor of Science in Electrical Engineering from the National Technical University of Athens in 1985. In 1990, he completed a Master of Business Administration from the Rensselaer Polytechnic Institute, followed by a PhD in Management of Technology from the Rensselaer Polytechnic Institute in 1994.

=== Academic career ===
After obtaining his PhD, Carayannis’s first main academic position was at the Anderson School of Management at the University of New Mexico in Albuquerque, NM, from January 1995 to July 1996, where he was assistant professor. Subsequently, he went to the George Washington University School of Business in Washington, D.C. in 1999. He obtained the rank of associate professor in 1999 and then Full Professor of Science, Technology, Innovation and Entrepreneurship in 2004.

== Work ==
Carayannis has consulted for a number of companies, governmental organizations, and NGOs, specifically those in the technology sector. Among the many organizations he has worked with are, in alphabetical order, Cowen & Co, the European Commission, First Albany International, the General Electric Corporate Training & Development Center, the Inter-American Development Bank, IKED, the National Coalition for Advanced Manufacturing (NACFAM), the National Institute of Standards and Technology Advanced Technology Program, the National Science Foundation Small Business Innovation Research Program, Sandia National Laboratories’ New Technological Ventures Initiative, the US Agency for International Development, the USN CNO Office, and the World Bank.

=== Research and publications ===
Carayannis' academic and research interests have been in the area of innovation economics, and he has over one hundred publications bearing his name in both academic and practitioner journals. These publications have spanned such topics as the Quadruple helix and Quintuple helix model, regional economic development, and science diplomacy. He is also editor-in-chief of a number of book series and journals. These include the Springer Encyclopedia of Creativity, Invention, Innovation and Entrepreneurship, the Palgrave Macmillan book series on Democracy, Innovation and Entrepreneurship for Growth, the Springer 'Journal of Technology, Innovation and Education', the Springer book series on Arts, Research, Innovation and Society, the Springer 'Journal of the Knowledge Economy', the Springer 'Journal of Innovation and Entrepreneurship: A Systems View Across Time and Space', the Edward Elgar book series on Science, Technology, Innovation and Entrepreneurship, the Springer book series on Innovation, Technology, and Knowledge Management, and the Springer Handbook of Cyber Development, Cyber Democracy and Cyber Defense.

=== Keynote speeches ===
Carayannis regularly organizes and delivers keynote speeches at knowledge-oriented events. These include:

- Smart Growth and the Quadruple / Quintuple Innovation Helix for Innovation and Entrepreneurship, International Conference on Innovation and Entrepreneurship, March 4–6, 2018, Washington, DC.
- In Pursuit of Smart Growth, Technology Transfer Society Annual Conference, Washington, DC, 2–4 November 2017.
- Smart Growth and the Quadruple / Quintuple Innovation Helix - World Organization of Systems and Cybernetics (WOSC), Rome, Italy, 17–20 January 2017.
- Heading Global, The Public Authority for Applied Education and Training, Kuwait, 14–16 November 2016.
