= Information capital =

Information capital is a concept which asserts that information has intrinsic value which can be shared and leveraged within and between organizations. Information capital connotes that sharing information is a means of sharing power, supporting personnel, and optimizing working processes. Information capital is the pieces of information which enables the exchange of Knowledge capital.

== Overview ==
In management, information capital is usually described as a set of data which are valuable for organisation and can be reached through different data storing systems, such as intro and internet systems, computer databases, libraries, and information sharing networks. Information capital can be used not only by organisations but by individuals as well. For example, if use of information capital enables an individual to analyse his spending on a certain type of products and determine how it compares in relation to his spendings on other products or to the spendings of other people, this might affect his future purchasing decisions. In the Information Era, efficient use of information capital highly depends on information capital readiness with IT, as information capital derived from information systems readiness. So companies which are investing more in IT systems might get competitive advantage over other businesses

== Information capital market ==
Information capital markets are commercial markets for the buying and selling of information and data. These markets connect data aggregators with organisations and individuals who need information for business, scientific or any other purposes. Regulating acts such as Data Protection Act 1998 and Data Protection Directive are imposed to control information capital market and prevent inappropriate usage of personal information by data aggregators or any other individuals and organizations. Although information has been bought and sold since ancient times, the idea of an information marketplace is relatively recent. The first Information market has formed around the Credit bureau type of organization for the exchange of personal information in the financial industry. But since that time Information market have changed radically. Nowadays Information markets are mainly hosted on electronic based data aggregation systems. Vast majority of them are accessible for both governments and organizations within corporate or any other sectors. Some information capital market platforms can be accessed directly by the public, for example SocialSafe Ltd which is social media backup tool that also allows users to download their content from a variety of social networks to their own personal data store and then sell this information directly.

== Era of Big data ==
Big data is large amounts of information which are so massive and complex that they become impossible to analyse using traditional data processing technologies, requiring special technologies instead. Recent advances in big data analyses have a potential to change the way information capital market operates nowadays, because if commercial organisations will be able to analyse and structure information about millions of people in any part of the world, this will negate the value of information which comes from one individual or organization, and will allow companies to make faster and more accurate data-driven decisions. Some scientists even predict that advances in big data analysis will have even larger effect on information capital market than the creation of the internet.

List of companies operating in big data analytics:

IBM - IBM offers DB2, Informix and InfoSphere database software, Cognos and SPSS analytics applications, and Global Services division.

HP - HP is a major provider of big data software analysis tools.

Oracle - Oracle develops both hardware and software products for big data processing. They include Oracle NoSQL Database, Apache Hadoop, Oracle Data Integrator and many other.

SAP - SAP is a largest provider of software appliances for big data handling and analytics.

Microsoft - Microsoft in partnership with Hortonworks offers the HDInsights tool which is used to analyse unstructured information provided by data aggregators.

Google - Google is working on development of BigQuery - first cloud-based big data processing platform.

== See also ==
- Content management
- Content value
- Data management
- Data science
- Expected value of perfect information
- Game theory
- Information assurance
- Information economics
- Information economy
- Information good
- Information management
- Information theory
- Knowledge management
- Value of information
