= Knowledge society =

Society driven by knowledge

A knowledge society is a society where a considerable portion of its material and human resources is invested in the production, dissemination, and application of knowledge, in order to increase the innovative capacity of both the productive system and social structures to improve human condition. A knowledge society differs from an information society in that the former serves to transform information into resources that allow society to take effective action, while the latter only creates and disseminates the raw data. The capacity to gather and analyze information has existed throughout human history. However, the idea of the present-day knowledge society is based on the vast increase in data creation and information dissemination that results from the innovation of information technologies. The UNESCO World Report addresses the definition, content and future of knowledge societies.

== Information and communication technology ==
The growth of Information and communication technology (ICT) has significantly increased the world's capacity for creation of raw data and the speed at which it is produced. The advent of the Internet delivered unheard-of quantities of information to people. The evolution of the internet from Web 1.0 to Web 2.0 offered individuals tools to connect with each other worldwide as well as become content users and producers. Innovation in digital technologies and mobile devices offers individuals a means to connect anywhere anytime where digital technologies are accessible. Tools of ICT have the potential to transform education, training, employment and access to life-sustaining resources for all members of society.

However, this capacity for individuals to produce and use data on a global scale does not necessarily result in knowledge creation. Contemporary media delivers seemingly endless amounts of information and yet, the information alone does not create knowledge. For knowledge creation to take place, reflection is required to create awareness, meaning and understanding. The improvement of human circumstances requires critical analysis of information to develop the knowledge that assists humankind. Absent reflection and critical thinking, information can actually become "non-knowledge", that which is false or inaccurate. The anticipated Semantic Web 3.0 and Ubiquitous Web 4.0 will move both information and knowledge creation forward in their capacities to use intelligence to digitally create meaning independent of user-driven ICT.

== Social theory ==
The social theory of a knowledge society explains how knowledge is fundamental to the politics, economics, and culture of modern society. Associated ideas include the knowledge economy created by economists and the learning society created by educators. Knowledge is a commodity to be traded for economic prosperity. In a knowledge society, individuals, communities, and organizations produce knowledge-intensive work. Peter Drucker viewed knowledge as a key economic resource and coined the term knowledge worker in 1969. Fast-forward to the present day, and in this knowledge-intensive environment, knowledge begets knowledge, new competencies develop, and the result is innovation.

A knowledge society promotes human rights and offers equal, inclusive, and universal access to all knowledge creation. The UNESCO World Report establishes four principles that are essential for development of an equitable knowledge society:

- Cultural diversity
- Equal access to education
- Universal access to information (in the public domain)
- Freedom of expression

However, they acknowledge that the digital divide is an obstacle to achievement of genuine knowledge societies. Access to the internet is available to 39 percent of the world's population. This statistic represents growth as well as a continued gap. Among the many challenges that contribute to a global digital divide are issues regarding economic resources, geography, age, gender, language, education, social and cultural background, employment and disabilities.

== Politics ==
To reduce the span of the digital divide, leaders and policymakers worldwide must first develop an understanding of knowledge societies and, second, create and deploy initiatives that will universally benefit all populations. The public expects politicians and public institutions to act rationally and rely on relevant knowledge for decision-making. Yet, in many cases, there are no definitive answers for some of the issues that impact humankind. Science is no longer viewed as the provider of unquestionable knowledge, and sometimes raises more uncertainty in its search for knowledge. The very advancement of knowledge creates the existence of increased ignorance or non-knowledge. This means that public policy must learn to manage doubt, probability, risk and uncertainty while making the best decisions possible.

To confront the uncertainty that comes from an increase in both knowledge and the resulting lack of knowledge, members of a society disagree and make decisions using justification and observation of consequences. Public policy may operate with the intent to prevent the worst possible outcome, versus find the perfect solution. Democratization of expert knowledge occurs when a knowledge society produces and relies on more experts. Expert knowledge is no longer exclusive to certain individuals, professional or organizations. If in a knowledge society, knowledge is a public good to which all people have access, any individual may also serve as a creator of knowledge and receive credit as an expert. Since politicians rely on expert knowledge for decision-making, the layperson who may lack specialized knowledge might hold a view that serves as expertise to the political process.

== Education ==
As technologies are deployed to improve global information access, the role of education will continue to grow and change. Education is viewed as a basic human right. For a society where reading and counting are a requisite for daily living, skills in reading, writing, and basic arithmetic are critical for future learning. However, in a knowledge society, education is not restricted to school. The advent of ICT allows learners to seek information and develop knowledge at any time and any place where access is available and unrestricted. In these circumstances, the skill of learning to learn is one of the most important tools to help people acquire formal and informal education. In a knowledge society supported by ICT, the ability to locate, classify and sort information is essential. Equipped with this skill, the use of ICT becomes an active versus a passive endeavor and integral to literacy and lifelong learning.

One marker of a knowledge society is continuous innovation that demands lifelong learning, knowledge development, and knowledge sharing. The institution of education will need to become responsive to changing demands. Education professionals will need to learn along with everyone else, and as leaders of changing designs in learning, they will serve as a bridge between technology and teaching. The ability to individually reflect on personal learning requirements and seek knowledge in whatever method is appropriate characterizes lifelong learning. One model that supports this type of learning is the W. Edwards Deming Plan-do-check-act cycle that promotes continuous improvement. Educational professionals will need to prepare learners to be accountable for their own lifelong learning.

== See also ==
- Collective problem solving
- Commons-based peer production
- Knowledge translation
- Open knowledge
- Sharing economy
- Wikipedia
