= International Association for Computing and Philosophy =

The International Association for Computing and Philosophy (IACAP) is a professional, philosophical association emerging from a history of conferences on computing and philosophy that began in 1986 (the CAP conferences). After the American A-CAP and the European E-CAP, the IACAP was founded in 2004. It adopts its mission from these conferences in order to promote scholarly dialogue on all aspects of the computational turn and the use of computers in the service of philosophy.

The role of the IACAP is to help facilitate a global communications network for those interested in computing and philosophy as defined by these themes. To this end, it sponsors a series of international conferences and this developing website.

The founding members of IACAP include Ron Barnette, Selmer Bringsjord, Terry Bynum, Robert Cavalier, Preston Covey, Marvin Croy, Charles Ess, James H. Moor, Nelson Pole, and Saul Traiger.

== Awards ==
IACAP has two annual awards: The Covey Award and The Herbert A. Simon Award. Both are decided by an independent committee and awarded at a ceremony at the annual conference.

=== The Covey Award ===
The Covey Award recognizes senior scholars with a substantial record of innovative research in the field of computing and philosophy, broadly conceived.

- 2024: Johannes Lenhard (University of Kaiserslautern-Landau)
- 2023: Oron Shagrir (Hebrew University of Jerusalem)
- 2022: Shannon Vallor (University of Edinburgh)
- 2021: Helen Nissenbaum (Cornell Tech)
- 2020: No award
- 2019: John Weckert (Charles Sturt University)
- 2018: Deborah G. Johnson (University of Virginia)
- 2017: Raymond Turner (University of Essex)
- 2016: Jack Copeland (University of Canterbury, New Zealand)
- 2015: William J. Rapaport (University at Buffalo, The State University of New York)
- 2014: Selmer Bringsjord (Rensselaer Polytechnic Institute)
- 2013: Margaret Boden (University of Sussex)
- 2012: Luciano Floridi (University of Hertfordshire)
- 2011: Terrell Bynum (Southern Connecticut State University)
- 2010: John R. Searle (University of California, Berkeley)
- 2009: Edward N. Zalta (Stanford University)

=== The Herbert A. Simon Award ===
The Herbert A. Simon Award is given to promising young researchers in the field (max. 10 years from PhD).

- 2024: Corey Maley (Purdue University)
- 2023: Kathleen Creel (Northeastern University)
- 2022: Björn Lundgren (Utrecht University)
- 2021: Carissa Véliz (University of Oxford)
- 2020: No award
- 2019: Juan M. Durán (Delft University of Technology)
- 2018: Thomas C. King (Oxford Internet Institute)
- 2017: Andrea Scarantino (Georgia State University)
- 2016: Marcin Milkowski (The Institute of Philosophy and Sociology of the Polish Academy of Sciences)
- 2015: Michael Rescorla (University of California-Santa Barbara)
- 2014: Gualterio Piccinini (University of Missouri–St. Louis)
- 2013: Judith Simon (University of Vienna)
- 2012: Patrick Allo (Vrije Universiteit Brussels)
- 2011: John P. Sullins (Sonoma State)
- 2010: Mariarosaria Taddeo (University of Hertfordshire; University of Oxford)

== Presidents ==
- Ramón Alvarado 2025-
- Steven T. McKinlay, 2022–2025
- Don Berkich, 2016–2022
- Mariarosaria Taddeo, 2013–2016
- Anthony Beavers, 2011–2013
- Luciano Floridi, 2006–2011
- Jon Dorbolo, 2003–2006
- Robert Cavalier, founder

== Research and teaching areas ==
IACAP research and teaching areas include:

- Artificial intelligence / cognitive science
- Artificial life / computer modeling in biology
- Computer ethics / information ethics
- Computer-mediated communication
- Culture and society
- Digital physics
- Distance education and electronic pedagogy
- Electronic publishing
- Logic and logic software
- Metaphysics (distributed processing, emergent properties, formal ontology, network structures, etc.)
- Online resources for philosophy
- Philosophy of information
- Philosophy of technology
- Robotics
- Virtual reality

== See also ==
- Barwise prize
