= Covey Award =

The Covey Award was established in 2008 by the International Association for Computing and Philosophy, to recognise "accomplished innovative research, and possibly teaching that flows from that research, in the field of computing and philosophy broadly conceived" .

The award is assigned annually, by the association's Executive Committee, while selection is done by an independent commission. It is meant for senior researchers, while the "Goldberg Graduate Award" is meant to recognise the achievements of graduate students.

Examples of areas that are of interest to the committee in selecting candidates for the Covey Award include: computational philosophy, the philosophy of artificial intelligence, information and computer ethics and the philosophy of information.

The association selected the name of Preston Covey for this award because his life's work exemplified a philosophical concern with computer-related research and teaching.

== Winners ==
Recipients include:

- 2009: Edward N. Zalta (Stanford University)
- 2010: John R. Searle (University of California, Berkeley)
- 2011: Terrell Bynum (Southern Connecticut State University)
- 2012: Luciano Floridi (University of Hertfordshire)
- 2013: Margaret Boden (University of Sussex)
- 2014: Selmer Bringsjord (Rensselaer Polytechnic Institute)
- 2015: William J. Rapaport (University at Buffalo)
- 2016: Jack Copeland (University of Canterbury)
- 2017: Raymond Turner (University of Essex)
- 2018: Deborah G. Johnson (University of Virginia)
- 2019: John Weckert (Charles Sturt University, Australia)
- 2020: (not awarded)
- 2021: Helen Nissenbaum (Cornell Tech)
- 2022: Shannon Vallor (University of Edinburgh)
- 2023: Oron Shagrir (Hebrew University of Jerusalem)
- 2024: Johannes Lenhard (Rhineland-Palatinate Technical University)

== See also ==
- List of psychology awards
