= Digital civics =

Digital literacy for civic engagement

Digital civics refers to a range of ethical and responsible civic behaviours, citizenship, or democratic engagement in the digital realm. The term itself is still establishing currency.

== Context ==
Digital civics has developed from concerns regarding the challenges faced by individuals and society in the digital age. As science and technology have advanced, so too, has human understanding of their place in the world. This has altered the way people interact with one another and the broader context in which they exist. Digital civics respond to these challenges by formulating a robust foundation upon which initiatives into digital citizenship and digital citizen engagement can be developed.

== Definitions ==
Researcher Estelle Clements defines digital civics as "the study of the rights and responsibilities of citizens who inhabit the info-sphere and access the world digitally." Clements, who was a doctoral researcher at the Dublin Institute of Technology, first put forward this definition in 2010 as part of an educational project done in conjunction with the Dublin City Public Libraries and Archive. The goal of their project was to teach about life in the online world.

According to Clements this definition meets three objectives:

1. It promotes an understanding of the environment where civic actions take place.
2. It acknowledges the information philosophy that underpins this environment.
3. It endorses the policy discourse that addresses the basic rights and ethical responsibilities of citizens.

Other conceptions of digital civics are still emerging. Newcastle University has suggested that Digital Civics is about "Digital technologies and citizen-driven design."

== Philosophy of information ==
Numerous scholars have suggested that the Philosophy of Information is the most logical course to underpin policy and project work for life in the digital age. The Information Philosopher Luciano Floridi has played a critical role in the success of such work, particularly in exploration of Information Society, European Policy, and the European Commission's Onlife initiative.

== Features ==
Clements identifies four underlying pillars that contribute to a robust digital civics as well as five key concepts in which digital civics is grounded.

=== Underlying pillars of Digital Civics ===
1. Philosophy (specifically the Philosophy of Information, as described by Luciano Floridi)
2. History (drawing from Media Ecology and Classical scholarship)
3. Ethics (particularly Virtue Ethics)
4. Civics (including the Universal Declaration of Human Rights, as well as a conjoining of the public and private personas called Hybrid selves).

=== Key concepts for Digital Civics ===
1. It acknowledges the transformations in human life and our world brought about by new scientific breakthroughs and technological developments, and the impact these changes have on how we behave.
2. It recognises the importance of responding to these changes in ethical and intellectually rigorous ways.
3. It appreciates that we have a long historical tradition from which to draw when addressing these challenges.
4. It acknowledges the informational nature of reality.
5. It recognise the importance of the rule of law and rights based on an entity's information state.

== Contention of digital civics and virtue ethics ==
In considering the ethical issues that arise from digital age civic issues, numerous scholars have suggested that such ethical initiatives should use virtue ethics as a basis for a shared global information ethics: namely, Charles Ess, Shannon Vallor, and Richard Volkman (2010). In her doctoral work on digital civics pedagogy, Clements suggests that her findings were compatible with a framework of virtue ethics. However, the information philosopher Luciano Floridi asserts that a global information ethics cannot be built upon virtue ethics, because virtue ethics is "intrinsically egopoeitic," and thus does not take into account responsibilities owed to the surrounding community or environment. To date, this matter is still contested.

== Educational programs ==
In 2010, the first pedagogical program for digital civics was started by the Oscar Wilde Facebook Laboratory. It was a collaboration between the Dublin City Public Libraries and Archive and the Dublin Institute of Technology's Estelle Clements. A global team of researchers and educators created a multi-platform (online and offline) learning environment to teach students and the public about digital civics. The project formed the basis of Clements' doctoral work, which formulated a Model for Digital Civics in pedagogy. At the time, Clements was particularly concerned that new digital citizenship initiatives were not considering the necessary underlying philosophical and ethical issues raised by the digital age and sought to provide a robust foundation to solve this problem.

In 2014, Newcastle University, launched a program to teach digital civics to postgraduate students at their Open Lab. The program research concentrates on "exploring how digital technologies can empower citizens and communities" and "trains doctoral students in the design, deployment and evaluation of community-driven digital technologies and services."

In 2018, The MacArthur Research Network on Youth and Participatory Politics (YPP) released a digital civics toolkit described as: "a collection of resources for educators to support youth to explore, recognize, and take seriously the civic potentials of digital life." The toolkit draws heavily from digital media literacy, focusing on five modules: Exploring Community Issues, Investigation, Dialogue, Voice, and Action".
