= Simon Rogerson =

British Professor

Professor Emeritus Simon Rogerson
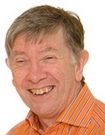
- Awards: IFIP Working Group 9.2 Namur Award (1999), ACM SIGCAS Making a Difference Award (2005)

Academic background
- Influences: Andrew Sereda, Christine Fidler, Terrell Ward Bynum, Donald Gotterbarn

Academic work
- Discipline: Computer Science, Information Systems, Applied Philosophy
- Main interests: Computer and Information Ethics, Information Systems, Professionalism, Information Integrity, Interdisciplinary Approaches
- Notable works: ETHICOMP conference series and academic community, SoDIS (Software Development Impact Statement), Software Engineering Code of Ethics and Professional Practice, World's first trilogy on Ethical Digital Technology
- Website: https://www.routledge.com/authors/i21506-simon-rogerson https://de-montfort.epexio.com/records/DPS/F/01 https://dmu.academia.edu/SimonRogerson

Simon Rogerson is lifetime Professor Emeritus in Computer Ethics at the Centre for Computing and Social Responsibility (CCSR), De Montfort University. He was the founder and editor for 19 volumes of the Journal of Information, Communication and Ethics in Society. He has had two careers; first as a technical software developer and then in academia as reformer (according to Huff and Barnard). He was the founding Director of CCSR, launching it in 1995 at the first ETHICOMP conference which he conceived and co-directed until 2013. He became Europe's first Professor in Computer Ethics in 1998. His most important research focuses on providing rigorously grounded practical tools and guidance to computing practitioners. For his leadership and research achievements in the computer and information ethics interdisciplinary field he was awarded the fifth IFIP-WG9.2 Namur Award in 2000 and the SIGCAS Making a Difference Award in 2005. He is author of the World's first Ethical Digital Technology trilogy comprising The Evolving Landscape of Ethical Digital Technology (2021), Ethical Digital Technology in Practice (2022) and Imagine! Ethical Digital Technology for Everyone (2023).(link to Taylor Francis)

== Industrial career ==
As a teenager Rogerson wanted to work in the computer industry. On graduating from the University of Dundee he joined Thorn Lighting as a Fortran Programmer in 1972. He progressed to Senior Systems Analyst before transferring to Thorn EMI in 1976 as Technical Systems Manager and where he became Computer Services Manager in 1981. He left his full-time post in 1983 to pursue a career in academia. However, he maintained his link with industry through freelance consultancy and membership of several professional bodies.

== Academic career ==
Rogerson joined the Department of Information Systems at Leicester Polytechnic (later to become De Montfort University) in 1983. He was appointed under a government initiative to attract IT industrialists in to Higher Education. Initially, he focused on lecturing about Project Management, Systems Analysis and Management Support Systems. It was the latter which led him into research starting by co-authoring works with Dr Christine Fidler culminating in the book Strategic Management Support Systems in 1996.

=== Teaching ===
Rogerson is an innovative educator. He created and was the founding course leader of a European-focused Business Information Systems Degree in 1990. He developed student guides for undergraduates, publishing Project Skills Handbook and co-authoring Successful Group Work. He introduced a series of course modules focussing on computer and information ethics. Rogerson and Tugrul Esendal developed and delivered an innovative course module addressing quality assurance and ethics in Software Engineering for which they received a Research Informed Teaching Award in 2007. He introduced the Information Society Doctoral Programme which continues to attract research students worldwide. In 2008, funded by HEFCE (Higher Education Funding Council of England) Rogerson developed a virtual learning environment for doctoral students at De Montfort University where they could learn about and discuss research ethics. In 2009 he ran a Masters Summer School on the Social Impact of Computing at Gdansk University of Technology, Poland.

=== Research ===
Through sharing his IS/IT industrial experience with his students Rogerson realised that current professional practice was having little effect on reducing the risk of IS/IT system failure. This led him to focus his research on new interdisciplinary approaches to IS/IT project management, design and implementation which embraced computer and information ethics. He and Donald Gotterbarn created the Software Development Impact Statement (SoDIS) process which encourages those involved in IS/IT project management to consider the wider ramifications of their work. An associated decision support tool, SoDIS Project Auditor was developed and successfully used around the world. As a member of the BCS Ethics Strategic Panel, he was one of the creators of DIODE, an ethical assessment tool for new and emerging technologies. He conceived and co-developed a dependency mapping method for the implementation of technological innovations. Rogerson's research extended to IS/IT application areas with notable work in electronic voting and personal health monitoring. A second important focus of Rogerson's research is professionalism in computing. His book Ethical aspects of information technology: Issues for senior executives, published in 1998 for the Institute of Business Ethics, remains one the few to address ethics of computing from a corporate perspective. He has made significant contributions to the development of professional standards in several computer related bodies. He was a member of the executive team which developed the Association for Computing Machinery (ACM) / IEEE Computer Society (IEEE-CS) Software Engineering Code of Ethics and Professional Practice for which he received the IEEE Certificate of Appreciation in 1998. He led the development of the code of ethics for the Institute for the Management of Information Systems and the redevelopment of the Code of Good Practice of BCS, The Chartered Institute of IT. Between 1998 and 2010 Rogerson led a longitudinal survey to explore the attitudes of information systems professionals. It provides a unique snapshot as seen through an ethical lens. Practitioner access to Rogerson's research was made possible through his regular ETHIcol column which he wrote for the IMIS Journal from 1995 to 2012.

=== Leadership ===
Rogerson has been the prime instigator in establishing a computer and information ethics movement in Europe. As founding director of the Centre for Computing and Social Responsibility (CCSR) his visionary leadership resulted in the ETHICOMP conference series, which he co-directed with Terry Bynum, and the Journal of Information, Communication and Ethics in Society. Professor Krystyna Gorniak, who attended ETHICOMP 95, wrote to Rogerson on 10 April 1995, "… the newly established CCSR is one of the prominent steps towards the creation of a world-wide network of scholars who are concerned about humankind's wellbeing in the age of computers …" CCSR's web site, which was launched in 1997, became the world's leading portal for computer and information ethics. With over 2 million annual visits it remained so until the advent of social media. There have been 15 ETHICOMP conferences to date with around 1,250 papers being presented. The ETHICOMP name has become recognised and respected in the field of computer and information ethics and in 1999 it was registered as a trademark by De Montfort University to control its use and ensure ongoing integrity on behalf of the ETHICOMP community. The Journal of Information, Communication and Ethics in Society continues to promote thoughtful dialogue regarding the wider social and ethical issues related to the planning, development, implementation and use of new media and information and communication technologies. After nineteen years Rogerson stepped down as founding editor at the end of 2021. His leadership extends into professional bodies. As chairman of the Institute for the Management of Information Systems (2009-2013) he led its incorporation into BCS – The Chartered Institute for IT (formerly British Computer Society) in 2013. In Europe he was one a five-person commission which undertook the review of FP6 (the European Union's Sixth Framework Programme for Research and Technological Development for the period 2002 to 2006) reporting its findings and recommendations to the European Commission. He led the development of the ethics guidelines for the ICT work programme of FP7 (European Union's Research and Innovation. funding programme for 2007-2013), making it mandatory for all European Union funded ICT research to address explicitly the ethical issues surrounding prospective research activity.

== Key Publications ==
- Rogerson, S., (1989) Project Skills Handbook, Chartwell-Bratt Publishing & Training Ltd., ISBN 9780862381462.
- Fidler, C., Rogerson, S., (1996), Strategic Management Support Systems, Financial Times Press (formerly Pitman Publishing), ISBN 0273614185.
- Rogerson, S. (1998, 2001), Computer and Information Ethics, in: Chadwick, R., (editor), Encyclopedia of Applied Ethics, Academic Press Inc, San Diego CA USA, 1998, pp 563–570. Reprinted in Chadwick, R., (editor), The Concise Encyclopedia of Ethics of New Technologies, Academic Press Inc, San Diego CA USA, 2001, pp 65–72. Reprinted in Chadwick, R., (editor), The Concise Encyclopedia of Ethics in Politics and the Media, Academic Press Inc, San Diego CA USA, 2001, pp 63–70.
- Rogerson, S., (1998), Ethical aspects of information technology: issues for senior executives, Institute of Business Ethics, ISBN 0952402041
- Gotterbarn, D., Miller, K. & Rogerson, S., (1999) Software Engineering Code of Ethics is Approved, Communications of the ACM, October Vol 42 No 10, 1999, pp102–107 and Computer, Oct 1999, pp 84–89. doi:10.1145/317665.317682
- Rogerson, S., (2002) Computers and Society, in: Spier, R.E., (editor), Science and Technology Ethics, Routledge, chapter 8, pp159–179, ISBN 041514812X.
- Fairweather, N.B., Rogerson, S., (2003) Internet Voting – Well at least it's 'Modern', Representation, Vol 39, No 3, pp182–196.
- Bynum, T.W., Rogerson, S., (eds.) (2004, 2010), Computer Ethics and Professional Responsibility, Blackwell, ISBN 1-85554-844-5 (Chinese translation published in 2010 by Peking University Press ISBN 978-7-301-15989-7)
- McRobb, S.; Rogerson, S. (2004). "Are They Really Listening? An investigation into published online privacy policies". Information Technology & People. 17 (4): 442–461. doi:10.1108/09593840410570285. S2CID 9493538.
- Rogerson, S., (2004), Aspects of Social Responsibility in the Information Society, in: Doukidis, G.I., Mylonopoulos, N.A. & N. Pouloudi, A. (editors), Social and Economic Transformation in the Digital Era, IDEA Group Publishing, Chapter 3, pp 31–46, 2004.
- Gotterbarn, D., Rogerson, S., (2005) Responsible Risk Assessment with Software Development: Creating the Software Development Impact Statement, Communications of the Association for Information Systems, Vol 15, Article 40 May. Available at http://aisel.aisnet.org/cgi/viewcontent.cgi?article=3162&context=cais
- Gotterbarn, D., Rogerson, S., (2006) Software design ethics for biomedicine, in: Nagl, S., (editor), Cancer Bioinformatics: From Therapy Design to Treatment, John Wiley, Chapter 12, pp213–231. ISBN 0-470-86304-8.
- Fairweather, N.B., Rogerson, S., (2007) A moral approach to electronic patient records. In Weckert, J. (ed) International Library of Essays in Public and Professional Ethics: Computer Ethics, Ashgate, Aldershot, Originally published 2001 in Medical Informatics and the Internet in Medicine Vol 26(3) pp219–234, doi:10.1080/14639230110076412.
- Rogerson, S., (2011) Ethics and ICT. in Galliers, R., Currie, W., (editors) The Oxford Handbook on Management Information Systems: Critical Perspectives and New Directions. Oxford University Press, Chpt 23, pp601–622, ISBN 9780199580583.
- Rogerson, S., (2013) The integrity of creating, communicating and consuming information online in the context of Higher Education Institutions. in Engwall, L., Scott, P. (eds) Trust in Universities. Wenner-Gren International Series, Volume 86, Chapter 10, pp. 125–136. ISSN 1477-996X
- Rogerson, S (2015). "Future Vision". Journal of Information, Communication and Ethics in Society. 13 (3/4): 346–360. doi:10.1108/jices-05-2015-0011. hdl:2086/11195.
- Rogerson, S., Miller, K.W., Winter, J.S. & Larson, D. (2017) "Information systems ethics – challenges and opportunities", Journal of Information, Communication and Ethics in Society, doi:10.1108/JICES-07-2017-0041
- Rogerson, S. (2018) Ethics omission increases gases emission: A look in the rearview mirror at Volkswagen software engineering. Communications of the ACM, Vol 61 No 3, March, pp. 30–32. doi:10.1145/3180490
- Rogerson, S., 2020. Poetical potentials: the value of poems in social impact education. ACM Inroads, 11(1), pp. 30–32.
- Rogerson, S., 2021. The Evolving Landscape of Ethical Digital Technology. Taylor & Francis Ltd. ISBN 9781032017211
- Rogerson, S., 2022. Grey digital outcasts and COVID-19. First Monday, 27(4). doi:10.5210/fm.v27i4.12587
- Rogerson, S., 2022. Ethical Digital Technology in Practice. Taylor & Francis Ltd. ISBN 978-1-032-14530-3 doi:10.1201/9781003309079
- Rogerson, S., 2023. Imagine! Ethical Digital Technology for Everyone.Taylor & Francis Ltd. ISBN 978-1-032-42217-6 doi:10.1201/9781003361763
- Rogerson, S., 2025. Poetic Potpourri. ISBN 978-1-9998826-2-4

== Recordings on YouTube ==
- E.Society – Panacea or apocalypse? The rights and wrongs of the Information Age. Inaugural Professorial Public Lecture, De Montfort University, 5.30pm, 26 May 1999.
- Opening address at ETHICOMP95 by Simon Rogerson and Terry Bynum The ETHICOMP conference series is recognised as the world's leading inclusive forum for discussing the social and ethical impacts of ICT. It started in 1995. This is the opening address given by the co-founders Simon Rogerson and Terry Bynum at the first conference on 28 March 1995.
- Digital Existence - the Modern Way to Be Invited Presentation, 12th IFIP TC9 Human Choice and Computers Conference, University of Salford, UK, 9 September 2016.
- Teaching Computer Ethics Orkney College, University of the Highlands & Islands, 22 May 2019.

== Recognitions and awards ==
1995

- Fellow of Institute for the Management of Information Systems (formerly IDPM)

1996

- Fellow of the Royal Society for the encouragement of Arts, Manufactures and Commerce (RSA)

1998

- IEEE Certificate of Appreciation for contributions to the development of the code of ethics for software engineering

1999

- IFIP Working Group 9.2 Namur Award for outstanding contribution to the creation of awareness of the social implications of information technology

2000

- Honorary Vice President, Institute for the Management of Information Systems (2000-2014)

2001

- The Internet; society's new frontierland, The Saturday Evening Public Lectures, University of Dundee, 10 Feb.

2003

- Finalist for the 2003 World Technology Award for Ethics
- Honorary Certificate in Data Protection, British Computer Society for the development of the ISEB data protection qualification

2004

- Fellow of BCS, The Chartered Institute of IT (formerly the British Computer Society)

2005

- ACM SIGCAS "Making a Difference" Award for advancing the cause of computing and social responsibility

2006

- International Pioneer and Diversity Award, International Health Foundation and Policy Study Institution on Muslim Health

2007

- Research Informed Teaching Award, De Montfort University for "Blended experiential learning in computer technology professionalism" joint award with Tugrul Esendal

2008

- Avoiding Ethical Disasters in the Information Age, Public lecture, Southern Connecticut State University, 1 April.

2010

- Professor Emeritus at De Montfort University
- The Challenge of Delivering Ethical ICT. Public Lecture, Values and Ethics Lecture Series of the Confident Futures Programme, Gordon Cook Foundation, Edinburgh Napier University, 16 November.

2012

- Honorary Adviser, iEthics - The Computer Ethics Society, Hong Kong

2018

- ACM Recognition of Service Award for contributions to the 2018 ACM Code of Ethics and Professional Conduct
