= Barwise Prize =

Philosophy and computing award

The K. Jon Barwise Prize (known as the Barwise Prize) was established in 2002 by the American Philosophical Association (APA), in conjunction with the APA Committee on Philosophy and Computers, on the basis of a proposal from the International Association for Computing and Philosophy for significant and sustained contributions to areas relevant to philosophy and computing.

The Prize is awarded annually, by the APA Committee on Philosophy and Computers. It serves to credit philosophers for their lifelong efforts in this field. It also serves to acknowledge and to encourage work in all areas relevant to the computational and informational turn in philosophy.

Examples of areas that are of interest to the committee in selecting candidates for this prize include: the use of computers in the teaching of philosophy; the philosophical aspects of artificial intelligence; and the area of computer ethics.

The committee selected the name of Jon Barwise for this prize because his life's work exemplified a concern with research and teaching, while his efforts were often embodied in the production of courseware and changes of curriculum.

== Winners ==
The Award has so far been won by:

- 2002: Patrick Suppes (Stanford University)
- 2003: Daniel Dennett (Tufts University)
- 2004: Deborah G. Johnson (University of Virginia)
- 2005: Hubert Dreyfus (UC Berkeley)
- 2006: James H. Moor (Dartmouth College)
- 2007: David Chalmers (Australian National University)
- 2008: Terrell Ward Bynum (Southern Connecticut State University)
- 2009: Luciano Floridi (University of Hertfordshire)
- 2010: Jaakko Hintikka (Boston University)
- 2011: Douglas R. Hofstadter (Indiana University)
- 2012: No award given
- 2013: Colin Allen (Indiana University)
- 2014: Helen Nissenbaum (New York University)
- 2015: William J. Rapaport (University at Buffalo)
- 2016: Edward Zalta (Stanford University)
- 2017: B. Jack Copeland (University of Canterbury)
- 2018: Gualtiero Piccinini (University of Missouri–St. Louis)
- 2019: Margaret Boden (University of Sussex)
- 2020: Aaron Sloman (University of Birmingham)
- 2021: Ben Goertzel (SingularityNET)
- 2022: John Etchemendy (Stanford University)
- 2023: Gabriele Gramelsberger (RWTH Aachen University)
- 2024: Oron Shagrir (Hebrew University of Jerusalem)
- 2025: Dana S. Scott (Carnegie Mellon University)
- 2026: Shannon Vallor (Edinburgh Futures Institute)

== See also ==
- List of computer science awards
