= Herman T. Tavani =

- Education: West Chester University (MA); Temple University (PhD)
- Occupations: Professor, academic, scholar, author
- Website: https://www2.rivier.edu/faculty/htavani/

Herman T. Tavani is an American academic, scholar in information and computer ethics, and Professor Emeritus of Philosophy at Rivier University, where he served as Chair of the Philosophy Department and Director of the Liberal Studies Program. He previously held appointments at Boston College Carroll School of Management and Dartmouth College's Humanities Institute (Leslie Center). Currently, he is a visiting scholar at the Harvard School of Public Health. He has authored scholarly publications on ethics, privacy, information, and computer technology. He is a past president of the International Society for Ethics and Information Technology and a recipient of the Weizenbaum Award in 2019.

== Education ==
Tavani earned his bachelor's and master's degrees in philosophy from West Chester University. He then pursued his Ph.D. in philosophy at Temple University. His specialty areas include artificial intelligence ethics, philosophy and technology, information computer ethics, public health ethics, and critical reasoning/logic.

== Career ==
Tavani taught philosophy courses at Rivier University from 1980 until his retirement from full-time teaching in 2011, and now he serves as an emeritus professor. He previously held roles as Chair of Rivier’s Philosophy Department and Director of the University’s Liberal Studies Program.

Tavani also held academic appointments at Dartmouth College as a visiting scholar and associate research fellow and at the Harvard School of Public Health as a visiting scholar in environmental health ethics for over two decades. At Harvard's Center for Environmental Health, he specializes in addressing privacy and consent issues in studies utilizing emerging technologies.

Tavani authored the study textbook "Ethics and Technology" and has written, edited, or co-edited five other books. His academic publications include journal articles, encyclopedia entries, review essays, book reviews, bibliographies, and edited volumes. He has delivered keynote addresses and presented scholarly papers at institutions across Europe, Japan, and the United States. He serves on editorial and review boards of several academic journals and has been the Book Review Editor of the Journal of Ethics and Information Technology since 1998, as well as a former associate editor of Computers and Society.

== Positions ==
- Current member and past president of the International Society for Ethics and Information Technology – 2008-2011.

- Former President of the Northern New England Philosophical Association.

== Selected works and publications ==
- Tavani, Herman T. (2016). Ethics and Technology: Controversies, Questions, and Strategies for Ethical Computing (5th ed.). Wiley. ISBN 9781119239758.
- Tavani, Herman T. (2004). Readings in CyberEthics (2nd ed.). Jones and Bartlett. ISBN 978-0763724108.
- Tavani, Herman T. (2005). Intellectual Property Rights in a Networked World. Information Science Pub. ISBN 978-1591405764.
- Tavani, Herman T. (2006). Ethics, Computing, and Genomics. Jones and Bartlett.
- Tavani, Herman T (2008). The Handbook on Information and Computer Ethics. Wiley. ISBN 9780471799597.
- Tavani, Herman T.- In E. N. Zalta (Ed.). (2012). "Search Engines and Ethics". Stanford Encyclopedia of Philosophy. In E. N. Zalta (Ed.).
- Tavani & Grodzinsky, Herman - Frances (2002). "Some Ethical Reflections on Cyberstalking". ACM SIGCAS Computers and Society. 32: 22–32. doi:10.1145/511134.511138.

== Awards and honors ==
- 2004: John Brubaker Award
- 2008: SIGCAS Outstanding Service Award
- 2019: Weizenbaum Award
