= Anthony Beavers =

American philosopher

- Born: 8 May 1963 (age 63); Portsmouth, New Hampshire

Philosophical work
- Era: Contemporary philosophy
- Region: Western philosophy
- Main interests: Philosophy of information; Philosophy of cognitive science; Computational philosophy (particularly artificial intelligence, machine ethics, cognitive modeling, and philosophy of mind); Ethical theory (including technological threats to moral realism and information ethics)
- Notable ideas: Quality-controlled academic search engine design, intelligent circuitry, information-theoretic philosophy of mind

Anthony Beavers (born 8 May 1963) is an American philosopher. As of 2012 He holds the positions of professor of philosophy, director of cognitive science, and director of The Digital Humanities Laboratory at the University of Evansville. Beavers received his MA and BA from Trinity College, Hartford and his PhD from Marquette University. He was the fourth president of the International Association for Computing and Philosophy (IACAP).

Throughout his career, Beavers has been interested in search-engine design. In 1996, he and Hiten Sonpal built the first peer-reviewed search engine, called Argos. Beavers is the creator and editor of the online journal Noesis.
