= List of psychology awards =

This list of psychology awards is an index to articles about notable awards given for work in the fields of psychology, cognitive sciences and psychiatry.

== List ==
Country	Award	Sponsor	Given for
Canada	CPA Donald O. Hebb Award for Distinguished Contributions to Psychology as a Science	Canadian Psychological Association	Significant contribution to Canadian psychology as a scientific discipline
Canada, United States	Howard Crosby Warren Medal	Society of Experimental Psychologists	The Society of Experimental Psychologists awards the Howard Crosby Warren Medal annually for outstanding achievement in Experimental Psychology in the United States and Canada.
Canada	Goethe Award for Psychoanalytic and Psychodynamic Scholarship	Canadian Psychological Association	Best psychoanalytic book
Canada	Otto Weininger Memorial Award	Canadian Psychological Association	Psychoanalytic or psychodynamic psychologist who has demonstrated outstanding clinical, empirical, or theoretical contributions in the areas of psychoanalytic or psychodynamic psychology Defunct.
Chile	National Prize for Natural Sciences	CONICYT	Various categories
Denmark	The Brain Prize	Lundbeck Foundation	Outstanding contribution to neuroscience and still active in research
Europe	Aristotle Prize	European Federation of Psychologists' Associations (EFPA)	Psychologist from Europe who has made a distinguished contribution to psychology
France	Jean Nicod Prize	French National Centre for Scientific Research	Leading philosopher of mind or philosophically oriented cognitive scientist
Germany	Kurt Koffka Medal	University of Giessen	To honor scientists who advanced the fields of perception or developmental psychology to an extraordinary extent
Italy	Mind & Brain Prize	Polytechnic University of Turin	Outstanding achievement in advancing knowledge about mind and brain by persons whose work contributed to the growth and development of the discipline
United Kingdom	BPS Barbara Wilson Lifetime Achievement Award	British Psychological Society	Outstanding contribution to neuropsychology in the United Kingdom
United Kingdom	Presidents' Award	British Psychological Society	honours a psychologist in mid to late career (10-25 years post PhD), currently engaged in research of outstanding quality that has made exceptional contributions to psychological knowledge
United Kingdom	Spearman Medal	British Psychological Society	Outstanding published work in psychology which represents a significant body of work in terms of theoretical contributions, originality, and impact
United States	APA Award for Distinguished Contributions to the International Advancement of Psychology	American Psychological Association	Distinguished and enduring lifetime contributions to the international cooperation and advancement of knowledge in psychology
United States	APA Award for Distinguished Professional Contributions to Applied Research	American Psychological Association	Psychologist whose research has led to important discoveries or developments in the field of applied psychology
United States	APA Award for Distinguished Scientific Contributions to Psychology	American Psychological Association	Psychologists who have made distinguished theoretical or empirical contributions to basic research in psychology
United States	APA Award for Lifetime Contributions to Psychology	American Psychological Association	Lifetime contributions
United States	APA Distinguished Scientific Award for an Early Career Contribution to Psychology	American Psychological Association	Outstanding research psychologists who are in the early stages of their career
United States	APA Distinguished Scientific Award for the Applications of Psychology	American Psychological Association	Applications of psychology
United States	APA International Humanitarian Award	American Psychological Association	Extraordinary humanitarian service and activism by a psychologist or a team of psychologists, including professional and/or volunteer work conducted primarily in the field with underserved populations
United States	Bruno Klopfer Award	Society for Personality Assessment	Lifetime achievement in personality psychology
United States	Covey Award	International Association for Computing and Philosophy	(Cognitive science) Accomplished innovative research, and possibly teaching that flows from that research, in the field of computing and philosophy broadly conceived
United States	Donald T. Campbell Award	APA Society for Personality and Social Psychology	Distinguished researchers in the field of social psychology
United States	E. L. Thorndike Award	American Psychological Association	Substantial career achievements in educational psychology
United States	Frank Prize	University of Florida	Research that advances public interest communications around positive social change, including issues such as education, health, politics, and the environment
United States	Grawemeyer Award	University of Louisville	Psychology: ideas rather than lifelong or publicized personal achievement
United States	James McKeen Cattell Fellow Award	Association for Psychological Science	Lifetime of significant intellectual contributions to the basic science of psychology
United States	Joseph Zubin Award (APPA)	American Psychopathological Association	Fundamental role in psychopathology research, contributed knowledge and stimulated others
United States	Joseph Zubin Award (SRP)	Society for Research in Psychopathology	Lifetime achievement award
United States	Joseph Zubin Memorial Fund Award	New York State Psychiatric Institute etc	Investigators who are in an early stage of their career, but have already made significant contributions to research in any area of psychopathology. From 1994 through 2010.
United States	Oskar Pfister Award	American Psychiatric Association, Association of Mental Health Clergy	Significant contributions to the field of religion and psychiatry
United States	Rumelhart Prize	Cognitive Science Society	Contributions to the theoretical foundations of human cognition
United States	Troland Research Awards	National Academy of Sciences	Researchers under the age of 40 in recognition of psychological research on the relationship between consciousness and the physical world
United States	William James Fellow Award	Association for Psychological Science	APS Members for their lifetime of significant intellectual contributions to the basic science of psychology

== See also ==
- Lists of awards
- Lists of science and technology awards
- List of medicine awards
