= Keith W. Miller =

American computer scientist

- Awards: Weizenbaum Award

Academic background
- Education: University of Iowa (PhD)

Academic work
- Sub-discipline: computer ethics, AI ethics
- Institutions: University of Missouri – St. Louis
- Website: https://drkeithwmiller.com/

Keith W. Miller is an American computer scientist and Orthwein Endowed Professor for Lifelong Learning in the Science Professor at the University of Missouri – St. Louis. He is a winner of the Weizenbaum Award and is known for his works on the computer ethics and AI ethics. The Park–Miller random number generator is named after him.

== Books ==
- D. Johnson with K. Miller. Computer Ethics: Analyzing Information Technology, 4th Ed. Prentice-Hall (2009).
