= Terrell Ward Bynum =

American philosopher, writer and editor

- Born: February 1941 (age 85); Pennsylvania, U.S.

Philosophical work
- Era: Contemporary philosophy
- Region: Western philosophy
- School: Analytic
- Main interests: Information revolution, metaphilosophy
- Notable ideas: Metaphilosophy

Terrell Ward Bynum (born 1941) is an American philosopher, writer and editor. Bynum is currently director of the Research Center on Computing and Society at Southern Connecticut State University, where he is also a professor of philosophy, and visiting professor in the Centre for Computing and Social Responsibility in De Montfort University, Leicester, England. He is best known as a pioneer and historian in the field of computer and information ethics; for his achievements in that field, he was awarded the Barwise Prize of the American Philosophical Association, the Weizenbaum Award of the International Society for Ethics and Information Technology, and the 2011 Covey Award of the International Association for Computing and Philosophy. In addition, Bynum was the founder and longtime editor-in-chief of the philosophy journal Metaphilosophy (1968 to 1993); a key founding figure (1974–1980) and the first executive director (1980–1982) of the American Association of Philosophy Teachers; biographer of the philosopher/ mathematician Gottlob Frege, as well as a translator of Frege's early works in logic. Bynum's most recent research and publications concern the ultimate nature of the universe and the impact of the information revolution upon philosophy.

== Education ==
As a teenager with a home chemistry set, Bynum became interested in the ultimate nature of the universe, an interest that was reinforced by a high school chemistry teacher who taught "the new chemistry" of the 1950s, and also by an English teacher who assigned philosophical writing exercises to her students. After high school, Bynum studied chemistry at the University of Delaware (1959 to 1963), where, in 1961, philosopher Bernard Baumrin created the Delaware Seminars in Philosophy of Science featuring lectures by world-famous philosophers of science, such as Carl Hempel, Adolph Grunbaum, and Ernest Nagel. Impressed by the Delaware Seminars, Bynum added philosophy as a second field of study, and Baumrin became his logic teacher and mentor. At that time, Bynum developed a strong interest in the life and work of philosopher/ mathematician Gottlob Frege. As an undergraduate at the University of Delaware, Bynum was surprised to learn that, although Gottlob Frege was considered by many to be "the greatest logician since Aristotle", very little was known about Frege's life, and some of his most important logical writings had never been translated into English. Bynum vowed to write Frege's biography and translate Frege's most important logical works, if the opportunity arose to do so.

In 1963, Bynum graduated from Delaware with a Bachelor of Science in chemistry with Honors and Distinction and a Bachelor of Arts in philosophy with Honors and Distinction. His senior thesis derived a complex acid-base algorithm from the laws of thermodynamics using symbolic logic. In 1963–64, he was a Fulbright Fellow at the University of Bristol, England, studying philosophy of science with Stephan Körner. From 1964 to 1967 he was a graduate student, with a Danforth Fellowship and a Woodrow Wilson Fellowship, in Princeton University's Program in the History and Philosophy of Science. In that program, he took courses that included, among others, history of science with Thomas Kuhn, philosophy of science with Carl Hempel, logic with Alonzo Church, and analytic philosophy with Richard Rorty. In 1966, he was awarded an MA in philosophy by Princeton. While still at Princeton, Bynum began writing a manuscript on Frege, which originally was to be a doctoral dissertation, but developed, instead, into the "Frege project".

To complete his university education, Bynum entered the PhD Program in philosophy at the Graduate Center of the City University of New York in 1982. He was granted an MPhil in philosophy from CUNY in 1984 and a PhD in philosophy in 1986. His doctoral dissertation was entitled Aristotle's Theory of Human Action, and it was written under the direction of Bernard Baumrin.

== Frege Project (1962 to 1972) ==
As a graduate student in Princeton's Program in History and Philosophy of Science, Bynum chose to make Frege's philosophy of mathematics and groundbreaking logical achievements the center of his graduate school research. This "Frege project" began to flourish in summer 1965 when Bynum was in Europe. He interviewed Bertrand Russell, who had discovered the famous "Russell's paradox" in Frege's logical foundation for arithmetic; and he also interviewed Rudolf Carnap, who had been a student of Frege's. Of special importance was a meeting that Bynum had with Ignacio Angelelli, who recently had visited Jena University in Germany where Frege spent his entire academic career. While in Jena, Angelelli had secured a photograph of Frege and a wealth of materials about Frege's career and personal life. He generously shared those materials with Bynum. During 1966 and 1967, Bynum completed the bulk of the work on his biography of Frege, his English translation of Frege's Begriffsschrift and related articles, and his extensive annotated Frege bibliography. In 1972 the resulting Frege book was published by the Clarendon Press branch of Oxford University Press. In 2002, it was republished as an Oxford Scholarly Classic, which, according to the editors of that Oxford series, is a "great academic work" containing "some of the finest scholarship of the last century".

== Metaphilosophy ==
In the mid-1960s, while he was a graduate student at Princeton, Bynum attended Richard Rorty's seminar on the history of analytic philosophy, where Rorty was trying out various articles for possible inclusion in his forthcoming book The Linguistic Turn. According to Bynum, he and his fellow graduate students "were amazed at Professor Rorty's ability to 'stand back' from philosophy and describe how one branch of philosophy relates to another, how one school or method of philosophy compares to other schools and methods, how philosophy relates to other disciplines, and so on... [Rorty] had a remarkable ability to explain and compare an impressive diversity of philosophical movements, schools, methods and trends." Bynum believed that there should be a philosophy journal specializing in the publication of such metaphilosophical articles, and he was surprised to discover that no such journal existed. He vowed, at that time, to create such a journal himself in a decade or two after he had established his career in philosophy. Surprisingly, he created such a journal, instead, in 1968, just a year after leaving Princeton. This happened because he sustained a serious eye accident in August 1968 that left him flat on his back in bed for a number of weeks. As a result, he quickly became bored and tried to think of something constructive to do. He hit upon the idea of creating the journal Metaphilosophy, and sought the advice of his undergraduate mentor, Bernard Baumrin. Baumrin suggested that Bynum should persuade a number of famous philosophers to serve on a Board of Consulting Editors, then send a journal proposal to the publisher Basil Blackwell, who already published several important philosophy journals, such as Mind. Bynum followed Baumrin's advice and sent a proposal to Blackwell in late 1968. Blackwell accepted Bynum's proposal, and the first issue of Metaphilosophy was published in January 1970. The journal flourished, and in 1977 the librarians' magazine Choice described it as "one of the top English-language philosophy journals". Bynum remained Editor-in-Chief of Metaphilosophy until 1993, when he turned it over to his colleague, Armen Marsoobian, at Southern Connecticut State University, because he had become very busy creating and running the Research Center on Computing and Society.

== American Association of Philosophy Teachers ==
In the late 1960s and early 1970s, during the Vietnam War, university students across America demanded that their university courses should be "relevant" to their lives and to the solution of urgent social problems. In this environment, as the Editor-in-Chief of Metaphilosophy, Bynum had begun (in 1969) to accept articles on topics, such as "applied philosophy" and philosophical analyses of social unrest, as well as articles on the improvement of the teaching of philosophy. By 1974, Bynum was convinced that there should be a national conference on the teaching of philosophy, not only to improve the teaching of traditional philosophy courses, but also to create new courses in applied philosophy in new environments, such as elementary schools, high schools, technical colleges, public libraries, prisons and "old folks' homes". He organized and headed a conference planning committee consisting of scholars and teachers from universities, colleges, technical schools, high schools, elementary schools, and a representative of the American Philosophical Association. The resulting conference was called The National Workshop-Conference on Teaching Philosophy, and it occurred on the campus of Union College in Schenectady, New York in August 1976. It lasted five days and attracted over 300 attendees from the United States, Canada and Japan. At the closing session, the attendees asked Bynum and his committee to put together a similar conference to be held two years later.

In August 1978, the Second National Workshop-Conference on Teaching Philosophy, again headed by Bynum, occurred for a second time on the Union College campus. At the closing session, attendees asked Bynum and his committee to put together a professional organization to run such a workshop-conference every two years. Bynum appointed and headed a steering committee to create the new organization, which was to be called the American Association of Philosophy Teachers. In 1979, with advice from the steering committee, Bynum wrote the constitution and articles of incorporation and filed legal papers to make AAPT an official non-profit educational membership corporation of the State of New York. In August 1980, on the campus of the University of Toledo, the Third National Workshop-Conference on Teaching Philosophy became the first official conference of AAPT, and Bynum was selected as the first executive director, a position that he held for four years. He remained on the AAPT's board of officers until 1994, serving as vice-president in 1989 to 1990, president in 1991–1992, and past president in 1993–1994. Since 1980, AAPT has continued to run Workshop-Conferences in August every two years.

== Research Center on Computing and Society ==
In 1978, Bynum attended a workshop on the topic of computer ethics conducted by Walter Maner, who was a member of the Philosophy Department of Old Dominion University. Maner had recently coined the name "computer ethics" and was teaching an experimental course on that subject at Old Dominion. That workshop was a career-changing event for Bynum, who became convinced by Maner that computer ethics was a vital subject that should be advanced and expanded. Bynum set himself the goal of spreading knowledge of computer ethics across America. With advice from Maner, he began to incorporate computer ethics components into his university courses, and he also started conducting workshops of his own. He encouraged Maner to publish his booklet, "A Starter-Kit on Teaching Computer Ethics", with the help of a small publishing company, Helvetia Press, that Bynum and his Swiss wife had created to disseminate applied-philosophy teaching materials generated by National Workshop-Conferences on Teaching Philosophy. (See the discussion of AAPT above.) Maner's "Starter Kit" was acquired by scores of schools and colleges across America in the early 1980s.Maner, Walter (1980). A Starter Kit on Teaching Computer Ethics. Helvetia Press.

Also in the early 1980s, to demonstrate to fellow philosophers that computer ethics was an important and viable new branch of applied ethics, Bynum decided to create an entire computer ethics issue of the journal Metaphilosophy (he was editor-in-chief of the journal at the time). To generate papers for the special issue, he arranged an essay competition on the topic of computer ethics, with a $500 first prize plus publication in the special issue for the best half-dozen submitted papers. Professor James Moor of Dartmouth submitted the prize-winning paper "What is Computer Ethics?" which became the lead article in the special issue. The issue had its own title (Computers and Ethics) and "book cover", and it was published as the October 1985 issue of Metaphilosophy. It quickly became the widest-selling issue of the journal and remained so for many years. Bynum, Terrell (1985). Computers and Ethics. Vol. 15. Blackwell.

In 1986 Bynum decided to find a university that would enable him to create a world-class research center on computer ethics. The following year he joined the faculty at Southern Connecticut State University, where he created, in 1988, the Research Center on Computing and Society. To generate a "critical mass" of scholars with whom his Center could work, Bynum decided to organize a national conference to which he would invite philosophers, computer scientists, and other academics, as well as public policy makers and journalists. He and Walter Maner decided to work together to plan the conference. In 1989, the National Science Foundation provided a conference-planning grant (grant # DIR-8820595) enabling Bynum and Maner to form a committee of 16 distinguished scholars and computer science leaders to plan the National Conference on Computing and Values (NCCV). In August 1991, NCCV (funded by NSF grant # DIR-9012492) was held at Southern Connecticut State University. It included 400 attendees from 32 states of the USA plus 7 other countries. It generated a wealth of computer ethics materials, including six printed monographs, six videotapes, and a set of computer ethics syllabi. After the conference, the staff of the Research Center on Computing and Society spent three years editing the NCCV materials and disseminating them to more than 300 universities worldwide.

== Publications ==
- Bynum, Terrell Ward (2010), "Historical Roots of Information Ethics", in Floridi, Luciano, Handbook of Information and Computer Ethics, Cambridge University Press, pp. 20–38, ISBN 978-0-521-88898-1
- Bynum, Terrell Ward (2008), "Milestones in the History of Information and Computer Ethics", in Himma, Kenneth; Tavani, Herman, The Handbook of Information and Computer Ethics, Wiley, pp. 25–48, ISBN 978-0-471-79959-7
- Bynum, Terrell Ward (2008), "Norbert Wiener and the Rise of Information Ethics", in van den Hoven, Jeroen; Weckert, John, Information Technology and Moral Philosophy, Cambridge University Press, pp. 8–25, ISBN 978-0-521-85549-5
- Bynum, Terrell Ward (2006), "Flourishing Ethics", Ethics and Information Technology, 8, pp. 157–173, ISSN 1388-1957
- Bynum, Terrell Ward; Simon Rogerson, eds. (2004), Computer Ethics and Professional Responsibility, Blackwell, ISBN 1-85554-844-5 (Chinese translation published in 2010 by Peking University Press ISBN 978-7-301-15989-7)
- Moor, James; Bynum, Terrell Ward, eds. (2002), CyberPhilosophy: The Intersection of Computing and Philosophy, Blackwell, ISBN 1-4051-0073-7
- Bynum, Terrell Ward (2001), "Computer Ethics: Its Birth and its Future", Ethics and Information Technology, 3, pp. 109–118, ISSN 1388-1957
- Bynum, Terrell Ward; Moor, James, eds. (1998), The Digital Phoenix: How Computers Are Changing Philosophy, Blackwell, ISBN 0-631-20352-4
- Bynum, Terrell Ward, ed. (1985), Computers and Ethics, ISSN 0026-1068
- Bynum, Terrell Ward, ed., trans. (1972), Conceptual Notation and Related Articles, Oxford University Press
