= Programming ethics =

This article gives an overview of professional ethics as applied to computer programming and software development, in particular the ethical guidelines that developers are expected to follow and apply when designing and developing application software source code, and when they are part of a programmer-customer or employee-employer relationship. These rules shape and differentiate good practices and attitudes from the wrong ones when creating software or when making decisions on a crucial or delicate issue regarding a programming project. They are also the basis for ethical decision-making skills in the conduct of professional work.

== History ==
The American scholar Norbert Wiener, professor of Mathematics and Engineering at Massachusetts Institute of Technology, was the first person to set the basis for a new type of Ethics in the mid 1940s. He noticed that the innovations and advances in science and technology, along with the fast-growing computer industry, were leading to the appearance of this type of Ethics that he named “cybernetics” (from the Greek word for the pilot of a ship). The emerging use of computers and other technologies were bringing up new ethical issues that needed to be analyzed carefully using new ethical guidelines.

Wiener wrote three books that lay down a foundation to a new division of Ethics after World War II ended. The books were Cybernetics (1948), The Human Use of Human Beings (1950) and God and Golem, Inc. (1963). Even though he never saw himself creating a new area of Ethics, Wiener gave detailed examples where some ethical and social issues and implications, which were generated by the use of computers, could be identified. However, his ideas were not taken seriously by other scholars because they considered him an eccentric scientist that fantasized about Ethics (Bynum).

In 1976, a new term regarding Ethics, named “computer ethics,” was proposed by Walter Maner based on the ideas and principles of Norbert Wiener. Maner felt it was necessary to have a field of Ethics for the computer industry just as the medical and business industries had at that moment. Maner also defined that field as one that “studies ethical problems aggravated, transformed or created by computer technology” (Bynum), and he even designed a computer ethics course that could be imparted to university students.

In the early 1990s, Donald Gotterbarn claimed that computer ethics should be considered as professional ethics that could have the power to lead towards the development and advancement of standards of good practice and codes of conduct for computing professionals (Bynum). He worked with several professional-ethics advocates to write ethical guidelines for creating codes of Ethics. He formed part of the creation of Code of Ethics and Professional Conduct, adopted by the Association for Computing Machinery (ACM) in 1992, and Software Engineering Code of Ethics and Professional Practice, adopted by the Institute of Electrical and Electronics Engineers (IEEE) and the ACM as well. These codes also include Programming Ethics principles.

== Programming Ethical Guidelines ==
The Association for Computing Machinery (ACM) is the world's largest educational and scientific computing society. It has its own Code of Ethics and another set of ethical principles that were also approved by the IEEE as the standard for teaching and practicing software engineering. These codes are Code of Ethics and Professional Conduct and the Software Engineering Code of Ethics and Professional Practice, respectively, and some of their guidelines are presented below:

From the Code of Ethics and Professional Conduct (ACM):

- Contribute to society and human well-being. Programmers should work to develop computer systems that can reduce negative consequences to society, such as threats to safety and health, and that can make everyday activities and work easier. It is “an obligation to develop to high standards” (Savage).
- Avoid harm to others. Computer systems have an indirect impact on third parties. They can cause loss of information and resources that might result severely harmful for users, the general public, or employers. Therefore, software developers should minimize the risk of harming others due to coding errors, or security issues, by following standards to design and test systems (Code of Ethics and Professional Conduct).
- Be honest and trustworthy. This principle encourages programmers to be honest and aware of their limitations in knowledge and education when writing computer systems. Also, if a programmer knows there is something wrong with a computer system, they should report it immediately to avoid undesirable consequences.
- Give proper credit for intellectual property. It is mandatory for every software developer to never use and take credit for someone else's work, even when it has not been protected by a copyright law, patent, etc. They must recognize and fully credit other people's works, and they should use their own ideas to develop software.
- Respect the privacy of others. Computer systems are wrongly used by some people to violate the privacy of others. Software developers should write programs that can protect users’ private information and that can avoid other undesired people to have unauthorized access to it (Code of Ethics and Professional Conduct).
- Honor confidentiality. Unless required by law or any other ethical guideline, a programmer must keep secret any additional information related to their employer that arises from working in a project.

From Software Engineering Code of Ethics and Professional Practice (IEEE, ACM):

- Approve software only if they have a well-founded belief it is safe and meets specifications. Programmers cannot assume that a system is ready to use only because it performs the tasks needed. They should make sure these systems are also safe and meet every specification required by the user. If programs are not safe, users are unprotected from hackers that could steal important information or money. Therefore, several tests should be performed in order to ensure a system's security before approving it.
- Accept full responsibility for their own work. If a program presents errors, the software developer should accept full responsibility for their work, and should work on revising, correcting, modifying, and testing it.
- Not knowingly use software that is obtained or retained either illegally or unethically. If a computer system will be used as a base for the creation of another, then permission to do so should be asked by the programmer. This principle prohibits using any other software for any purpose if the way it was gotten is not clear or is known to be illegal or unethical.
- Identify, define, and address ethical, economic, cultural, legal and environmental issues related to work projects. If a programmer notices and identifies that working on a project will lead to any kind of problems, then the programmer should report it to their employer before continuing.
- Ensure that specifications for software on which they work satisfy the users’ requirements and they have the appropriate approvals. Software developers should come to their employers to ask for the correspondent approval to the system they are creating before continuing working on the next part. If it doesn't meet the requirements, then a modification to the source code of the system should be made.
- Ensure adequate testing, debugging and review of software. Programmers should perform the appropriate tests to the pieces of software they work with, and should check for errors and system security holes to make sure that the programs are well implemented.
- Not engage in deceptive financial practices such as bribery, double billing, or other improper financial practices. Programmers are exposed to be participants in illegal activities to get money. They get involved in them due to threats, economic issues, or simply because they want to obtain easy money by taking advantage of their knowledge about how computer systems work. This guideline prohibits programmer involvement in such unlawful actions.
- Improve their ability to create safe, reliable, and useful quality software. Since technology advances faster year by year, and so does virtual criminality, the need of well-structured and designed programs is increasing. Computer systems get old and limited by new ones and new devices. Programmers should “further their knowledge of developments in the analysis, specification, design, development, maintenance, and testing software and related documents” (Software Engineering Code of Ethics and Professional Practice) in order to create better pieces of software.

== University's Role ==
Ohio University also trains their computer science majors on the field of programming ethics. They expect every student to understand and follow ACM's principles and responsibilities.

== Legal consequences ==
Intentionally making mistakes like creating insecure passwords or leaving security holes in the implementation of a program that could compromise a system's security and reliability exposes the programmer to trial. The specific sanctions that might result from a programming-related legal dispute will vary from one state to another. Sanctions may include corrective actions, a certain number of hours of social work, or months or years in jail.

== See also ==
- ACM: Association for Computing Machinery
- IEEE: Institute of Electrical and Electronics Engineers
- Computer science
- Computer programming
- Computer ethics
- Code of conduct
- Software
