= The AI Mirror: How to Reclaim Our Humanity in an Age of Machine Thinking =

The AI Mirror: How to Reclaim Our Humanity in an Age of Machine Thinking is a 2024 non-fiction book by American philosopher of technology Shannon Vallor. Published by Oxford University Press, the book examines the social and ethical consequences of artificial intelligence and argues that contemporary AI systems should be understood less as independent minds than as mirrors of human data, institutions and values.

== Synopsis ==
Vallor distinguishes the statistical production of AI outputs from human capacities such as moral judgement, empathy, practical reasoning and imagination. She argues that AI systems primarily work with information inherited from the past. While human beings are capable of considering futures that have not previously existed. The book draws on the myth of Narcissus. Whose fascination with his own reflection prevents him from engaging with the world around him. Vallor uses the story to argue that people may mistake the fluent outputs of AI systems for understanding, agency or moral authority.

== Review ==
A review in the Financial Times described the book as a clarifying examination of the ways AI may reinforce existing power structures and restrict human potential. Writing in the Stanford Social Innovation Review, Jasmine McNealy praised Vallor's challenge to claims of AI superiority and her emphasis on human responsibility for technological systems. McNealy found the book less successful in offering concrete steps for changing the economic and political structures surrounding AI. Jaehoon Lee, writing in Critical Inquiry described the book as a philosophically ambitious intervention. Archana Raghavan reviewing the book for The Sociological Review, mentioned that the book made a substantial contribution to debates about AI and social control. She observed that Vallor gave limited attention to contemporary policy and placed greater emphasis on individual ethics than on structural social theories.
