= Noesis (online journal) =

- Discipline: Philosophy
- Language: English

Publication details
- History: 1998–present
- Publisher: University of Evansville (United States)
- Open access: Yes

Standard abbreviations
- ISO 4: Noesis

Links
- Journal homepage

Noesis is a domain-specific search engine and open access journal for academic philosophy. The current online version is a prototype release. Noesis may be treated as a sort of clearinghouse for scholarly e-journals in philosophy.

Noesis is currently undergoing development at Indiana University, thanks to a Digital Humanities Initiative of the National Endowment for the Humanities. The editor-in-chief is Anthony Beavers (University of Evansville).
