= Philosophy of computer science =

The philosophy of computer science is concerned with the philosophical questions that arise within the discipline of computer science. There is still no common understanding of the content, aims, focus, or topics of the philosophy of computer science, despite some attempts to develop a philosophy of computer science like the philosophy of physics or the philosophy of mathematics. Due to the abstract nature of computer programs and the technological ambitions of computer science, many of the conceptual questions of the philosophy of computer science are also comparable to the philosophy of science, philosophy of mathematics, and the philosophy of technology.

== Overview ==
Many of the central philosophical questions of computer science are centered on the logical, ethical, methodological, ontological and epistemological issues that concern it. Some of these questions may include:

- What is computation?
- Does the Church–Turing thesis capture the mathematical notion of an effective method in logic and mathematics?
- What computational limitations does Turing's Halting Problem imply?
- What are the philosophical consequences of the P vs NP problem?
- What is information?
- How do ethics impact real-world applications of computers?

== Computation ==
The question of "What is computation?" remains a central question in relation to the philosophy of computer science. According to Nir Fresco, deciphering what a computation is requires distinguishing between computation and non-computational processes. Fresco identifies three main perspectives.

The first view is the semantic view. Supporters of this view hold that computations are viewed as internal processes occurring within a computing mechanism. Advocates have argued that computation involves manipulating symbol structures, content, and truth-preserving rules. However, this view has been criticized for depending on human interpretations rather than the inherent qualities of technology.

The second view is the causal view. According to this perspective, computations are defined by their causal characteristics. A system executes a calculation when the transformations in its physical state correspond to the structure of an abstract algorithm. This theory relates computations to cause-and-effect relationships between system components. Thus, it is linked to physical causation rather than semantic meaning.

The third view is the functional view. In this view, computation is distinguished by its functional characteristics, or the functions and relationships of its component pieces. According to this perspective, the organization of a mechanism's parts to do particular tasks is more important than whether the symbols have external meaning.

These various perspectives illustrate the ongoing debate about the meaning of computation and whether it is defined by symbolic meaning, physical causation, or functional organization.

== Church–Turing thesis ==
The Church–Turing thesis and its variations are central to the theory of computation. Since, as an informal notion, the concept of effective calculability does not have a formal definition, the thesis, although it has near-universal acceptance, cannot be formally proven. The implications of this thesis is also of philosophical concern. Philosophers have interpreted the Church–Turing thesis as having implications for the philosophy of mind.

== Turing's Halting Problem ==
Another major concept in computer philosophy is Turing's Halting Problem. This problem concerns whether it is possible to write a program that can determine if another program will run continuously or terminate. It is widely accepted as an undecidable problem (a problem with a solution that cannot be found through an algorithm). This result established that there are limits to computer computations. Although the idea is often attributed to Alan Turing's 1936 paper On Computable Numbers, recent research indicates that the term and its modern formulation appeared later. The expression halting problem was first used and formally stated by Martin Davis in his 1958 book Computability and Unsolvability.

== P versus NP problem ==
The P versus NP problem is an unsolved problem in computer science and mathematics. It asks whether every problem whose solution can be verified in polynomial time (and so defined to belong to the class NP) can also be solved in polynomial time (and so defined to belong to the class P). Most computer scientists believe that P ≠ NP. Apart from the reason that after decades of studying these problems no one has been able to find a polynomial-time algorithm for any of more than 3000 important known NP-complete problems, philosophical reasons that concern its implications may have motivated this belief.

For instance, according to Scott Aaronson, the American computer scientist then at MIT:

If P = NP, then the world would be a profoundly different place than we usually assume it to be. There would be no special value in "creative leaps", no fundamental gap between solving a problem and recognizing the solution once it's found. Everyone who could appreciate a symphony would be Mozart; everyone who could follow a step-by-step argument would be Gauss.

== Computer Ethics ==
Computer ethics shapes the way that computers interact and how they are implemented in real-world scenarios. These ethics address issues such as user privacy, security, and professional responsibility. These topics are subject to scholarly discussion and professional debate.

Scholars and technology innovators have long debated the existence of privacy online. Samuel D. Warren and Louis D. Brandeis argued in an academic paper that they believe that with the new age of technology, a right to privacy is necessary; however, others believe that privacy is a promise that can never be fulfilled. In Sun Microsystems' CEO Scott McNealy's words, "Privacy is dead. Get over it." The introduction of computer technology raises many issues regarding privacy. These issues can range from intentionally malicious actions, such as spreading information against a user's will, to innocent mistakes, such as accidentally releasing information to the public when it was meant to be private. There are also discussions related to the ethicality of keeping important information private. The conclusion of such becomes ambivalent when discussing the privacy of individual users versus governmental bodies. In the case of individual users, choosing not to reveal information is seen as ethical. In the case of government entities, choosing not to disclose information can be seen as harmful.

Security focuses on protecting the systems and data of users from unauthorized access or harm. Malicious software is typically the center of discussion for computer security. While it is generally considered unethical to intentionally spread malicious software, such as computer viruses, there is debate about whether users have an ethical responsibility to ensure the security of their own systems. Users who fail to protect their own computer systems expose other computer users to risk. There are also discussions of cases where the distribution of viruses is ethical. An example of this is when a virus is spread to expose a weakness in the protection of computer systems.

Professional ethics addresses the responsibilities and duties of software developers. Bugs in software can cause system failures. This can range from minor annoyances to severe, real-life consequences for the user. While it is generally accepted that bugs should not be included in software and that it is the developer's responsibility to correct them, bug-free software is rarely obtainable. Commonly, developers release software with bugs they deem less important than other, more critical issues. If important bugs are discovered, software patches are distributed throughout the software's lifespan. Even though this is quite common in practice, it raises ethical questions. Scholars debate the extent to which releasing a product with known issues is acceptable.

== See also ==
- Computer-assisted proof: Philosophical objections
- Philosophy of artificial intelligence
- Philosophy of information
- Philosophy of mathematics
- Philosophy of science
- Philosophy of technology
