= Weizenbaum Award =

Biennial award in information and computer ethics

The Weizenbaum Award was established in 2008 by the International Society for Ethics and Information Technology (INSEIT). It is given every two years by INSEIT's adjudication committee to an individual who has “made a significant contribution to the field of information and computer ethics, through his or her research, service, and vision.”

It is officially named the 'INSEIT/ Joseph Weizenbaum Award in Information and Computer Ethics', "in recognition of Joseph Weizenbaum’s groundbreaking and highly influential work in computer ethics in the 1970s, which helped to shape the field as we know it today".

== Winners ==
The Award has been won by:

- 2025: Frances Grodzinsky, awarded in CEPE 2025 in Rome
- 2022: Philip Brey, awarded in CEPE 2023 in Chicago
- 2020: Rafael Capurro, awarded in CEPE/IACAP 2021, Hamburg
- 2019: Herman Tavani, awarded in CEPE 2019, in Norfolk Virginia
- 2017: James Moor, in CEPE ETHICOMP 2017
- 2015: Deborah G. Johnson
- 2013: Luciano Floridi
- 2011: Keith W. Miller
- 2010: Donald Gotterbarn
- 2009: Terrell Ward Bynum. Abstract of Bynum Weizenbaum address, given at CEPE 2009

== See also ==
- List of computer science awards
