= Virtuality fallacy =

Arguing virtual things are not real

The virtuality fallacy, first identified in the context of ICT ethics by American ethicist James H. Moor in 2001, is a name given to the informal fallacy of asserting that things which exist in a virtual context are not real, or do not have real effects. The fallacy has the following form:

Premise 1: X exists in cyberspace.
Premise 2: Cyberspace is virtual.
Conclusion: X (or the effect of X) is not real.

This fallacy could be used by those who want to defend their own questionable behavior on the Internet by saying "This is not real and will not cause any harm to other people."
