= Robert Cavalier =

American philosopher

- Born: 1947 (age 78–79)

Education
- Education: Duquesne University (PhD), New York University (BA)

Philosophical work
- Era: 21st-century philosophy
- Region: Western philosophy
- Institutions: Carnegie Mellon University
- Main interests: ethics, political philosophy

Robert Cavalier (born 1947) is an American philosopher and teaching professor emeritus of philosophy at Carnegie Mellon University. Cavalier is director of the department of philosophy’s Program for Deliberative Democracy and is known for his works on ethics and political philosophy. His career ranges over the fields of computing and philosophy, interactive multimedia, and deliberative democracy.

== Books ==
- Approaching Deliberative Democracy: Theory and Practice (ed.), Carnegie Mellon University Press (2011)
- Democracy for Beginners. For Beginners LLC (2009)
- The Impact of the Internet on Our Moral Lives (ed.), SUNY Press (2005)
- With Covey, Thompson and Style, CD-ROM: The Issue of Abortion in America (Routledge, 1998)
- With Covey and Andersen, CD-ROM: A Right to Die? The Case of Dax Cowart (Routledge, 1996)
