= Onlife =

Neologism coined by Italian philosopher

Onlife is a neologism coined by philosopher Luciano Floridi in 2012. The concept is a portmanteau of online and life referring to "the new experience of a hyperconnected reality within which it is no longer sensible to ask whether one may be online or offline". The term has taken inspiration from Hannah Arendt's The Human Condition (1958) "to better understand and articulate the interactions of [Information and communications technology] with notions of public space in particular and our contemporary lifeworld more generally". The manifesto brought together academics from across Europe to discuss the social effects, policy-making, ethical implications, and legal advancements related to hyperconnectivity in Europe and beyond. The term gained significant recognition with the publication of the 2015 Onlife Manifesto, edited by Floridi himself.

== Scholarly uses ==
Onlife as concept has been used internationally by scholar Mireille Hildebrandt in the fields of criminal justice, as well as by Surveillance Studies expert David Lyon within sociology. It also significantly contributed to conceptualise the effects of hyperconnectivity in psychology, technology and law, and criminology.
