= Preston Covey =

American philosopher (1942–2006)

Preston K. Covey, Jr. (29 August 1942 - 18 September 2006) was the head of the philosophy department at Carnegie Mellon University, Pittsburgh, Pennsylvania, United States, during the later part of the twentieth century.

Covey, who earned his Ph.D. jointly through the philosophy department and the humanities graduate programs at Stanford University, founded the Center for the Advancement of Applied Ethics (CAAE). He joined the Carnegie Mellon faculty in 1973. Covey played a pivotal role in shaping the university's Philosophy Department, serving as its director and overseeing its transition to a full department in 1986. He received the Elliott Dunlap Smith Award for Teaching and Educational Service and helped establish the Ethics, History, and Public Policy major.

Covey was a pioneer in integrating computing into philosophy, leading innovative projects like interactive logic tools and multimedia software on ethical dilemmas. As the director of the Center for the Advancement of Applied Ethics, he explored topics ranging from bioethics to democratic responsiveness, mentoring students and philosophers worldwide. The Covey Award, for contributions to the field of computing and philosophy, is named after him.

Beyond academia, Covey contributed to law enforcement as a deputy sheriff and ethics trainer, exemplifying his commitment to applied philosophy and practical service.
