= Ten Commandments of Computer Ethics =

Code for ethical use of computers

The Ten Commandments of Computer Ethics were created in 1992 by the Washington, D.C.–based Computer Ethics Institute. The commandments were introduced in the paper "In Pursuit of a 'Ten Commandments' for Computer Ethics" by Ramon C. Barquin as a means to create "a set of standards to guide and instruct people in the ethical use of computers." They follow the Internet Advisory Board's memo on ethics from 1987. The Ten Commandments of Computer Ethics copies the archaic style of the Ten Commandments from the King James Bible.

The commandments have been widely quoted in computer ethics literature but also have been criticized by both the hacker community and some in academia. For instance, Dr. Ben Fairweather of the Centre for Computing and Social Responsibility has described them as "simplistic" and overly restrictive.

ISC2, one of the thought leaders in the information security industry, has referred to the commandments in developing its own ethics rules.

== The Ten Commandments of Computer Ethics ==
1. Thou shalt not use a computer to harm other people.
2. Thou shalt not interfere with other people's computer work.
3. Thou shalt not snoop around in other people's computer files.
4. Thou shalt not use a computer to steal.
5. Thou shalt not use a computer to bear false witness.
6. Thou shalt not copy or use proprietary software for which you have not paid (without permission).
7. Thou shalt not use other people's computer resources without authorization or proper compensation.
8. Thou shalt not appropriate other people's intellectual output.
9. Thou shalt think about the social consequences of the program you are writing or the system you are designing.
10. Thou shalt always use a computer in ways that ensure consideration and respect for other humans.
