= Deborah G. Johnson =

American philosopher (born 1945)

Deborah Johnson
- Born: 1945 (age 80–81)
- Awards: Covey Award, Weizenbaum Award, Barwise Prize

Academic background
- Education: University of Kansas (PhD)

Academic work
- Discipline: Philosophy
- Sub-discipline: engineering ethics
- Institutions: University of Virginia

Deborah G. Johnson (born 1945) is an American philosopher and ethicist known for her work in computer ethics, engineering ethics, and the ethical, social, and policy implications of emerging technologies. She is Anne Shirley Carter Olsson Professor of Applied Ethics, Emeritus, in the Department of Engineering and Society at the University of Virginia. Johnson is known as one of the founding figures in the field of computer ethics, having authored one of the earliest textbooks on the subject and contributed extensively to debates about technology, responsibility, and public policy.

She was President of the International Society for Ethics and Information Technology and President of the Society for Philosophy and Technology

Her book Computer Ethics (1985) was the first significant textbook in the discipline and rapidly became the main resource used in computer ethics courses at universities.

== Career ==
Johnson earned her Ph.D. in philosophy from the University of Kansas in 1976. She began her academic career at Old Dominion University and held teaching and research positions at institutions including the University of Kansas, Wayne State University’s Monteith College, Princeton University, and Rensselaer Polytechnic Institute (RPI). At RPI, she served as Professor of Philosophy in the Department of Science and Technology Studies (STS), where she was also Department Chair (1996–1998) and Associate Dean of the School of Humanities & Social Sciences (1990–1992).

From 1998 to 2001, Johnson was Professor in the School of Public Policy at the Georgia Institute of Technology, where she also directed the Program in Philosophy, Science, and Technology and the Master's Program in Public Policy.

In 2001, Johnson joined the University of Virginia (UVA) as the Anne Shirley Carter Olsson Professor of Applied Ethics in the Department of Science, Technology, and Society (later renamed the Department of Engineering and Society) in the School of Engineering and Applied Science. She chaired the department from 2003 to 2012 and served as interim chair in 2021–2022. She retired in 2016 and holds the title of professor emeritus.

Johnson also held an adjunct professorship at the University of Bergen in Norway (2016–2020) as part of the ViSmedia project, where she worked on media, surveillance, and ethical issues in digital technologies.

== Scholarship and research ==
Johnson's scholarship has been foundational in shaping debates on issues such as computer privacy, surveillance, bias in algorithms, and the ethical responsibilities of engineers.

Her research explores how technology shaped by human values and societal structures, with a focus on sociotechnical systems.

She has authored or edited seven books, including Surveillance and Transparency as Sociotechnical Accountability: A House of Mirrors (with Priscilla Regan, 2014) and Engineering Ethics: Contemporary Debates (2020) for Yale University Press.

She has served on numerous national and international committees on ethics in technology, including advisory roles for the National Science Foundation and the Association for Computing Machinery.

Her work addresses topics such as accountability in artificial intelligence (AI), algorithmic decision-making, surveillance, privacy, and the ethics of autonomous systems. She has led and participated in numerous projects funded by the U.S. National Science Foundation, including research on Surveillance and Transparency as Sociotechnical Systems of Accountability and Ethics for Developing Technologies: An Analysis of Artificial Agents. In her early work, Johnson argued that technological advances like computers challenge but do not fundamentally change established moral values and principles. Instead, the introduction of new technologies requires extending and reinterpreting existing moral norms and rules. In the process of extending and reinterpreting, the moral norms do change but stay within the thrust of the established norms and rules. This debate about whether ‘new ethics’ are needed or established moral norms are sufficient for new technologies is often referred to as the uniqueness debate. Johnson argued that new technologies lead to ‘new species of generic moral problems’.

Johnson argues that while computer systems exhibit intentionality and influence human actions, they lack independent moral agency because they do not possess mental states or autonomous intentions.

More recently, Johnson has contributed to discussions on algorithmic accountability especially when it comes to AI systems. Her work stresses that accountability is a social practice and cannot be achieved simply by programming AI.

== Awards ==
She is a winner of the Covey Award, Weizenbaum Award, and Barwise Prize. Johnson is known for her works on the computer ethics and engineering ethics.

== Selected publications ==
=== Books ===
- Johnson, Deborah G.; Wetmore, Jameson M. (2021). Technology and society: building our sociotechnical future. Inside technology (2nd ed.). Cambridge, Massachusetts: The MIT press. ISBN 978-0-262-53996-8.
- Johnson, Deborah G. (2020). Engineering ethics: contemporary and enduring debates. New Haven: Yale University Press. ISBN 978-0-300-25279-8.
- Johnson, Deborah G.; Regan, Priscilla M., eds. (July 11, 2014). Transparency and Surveillance as Sociotechnical Accountability. Routledge. doi:10.4324/9781315757001. ISBN 978-1-315-75700-1.
- Johnson, Deborah G.; Miller, Keith (2009). Computer ethics: analyzing information technology (4th ed.). Upper Saddle River, N.J: Pearson Education Intern. ISBN 978-0-13-111241-4.
- Fox, Mary Frank; Johnson, Deborah G.; Rosser, Sue Vilhauer, eds. (2006). Women, gender, and technology. Urbana: University of Illinois Press. ISBN 978-0-252-07336-6.
- Johnson, Deborah G.; Nissenbaum, Helen Fay, eds. (1995). Computers, ethics & social values. Englewood Cliffs, N.J: Prentice Hall. ISBN 978-0-13-103110-4.

=== Book chapters ===
- Johnson, Deobrah G. (2020). "Promises and perils in immersive journalism". In Uskali, Turo; Gynnild, Astrid; Jones, Sarah; Sirkkunen, Esa (eds.). Immersive journalism as storytelling: ethics, production and design. London; New York: Routledge/Taylor & Francis Group. pp. 71–81. doi:10.4324/9780429437748-9. ISBN 978-0-429-43774-8.
- Johnson, Deborah G.; Gynnild, Astrid (February 19, 2018), "Transparency or surveillance?", Responsible Drone Journalism, London: Routledge, pp. 47–57, doi:10.4324/9781315163659-4, ISBN 978-1-315-16365-9
- Johnson, Deborah G. (2017), "Rethinking the Social Responsibilities of Engineers as a Form of Accountability", in Michelfelder, Diane P.; Newberry, Byron; Zhu, Qin (eds.), Philosophy and Engineering, Philosophy of Engineering and Technology, vol. 26, Cham: Springer International Publishing, pp. 85–98, doi:10.1007/978-3-319-45193-0_7, ISBN 978-3-319-45191-6
- Johnson, Deborah G. (August 9, 2017), "Ethical Issues in Big Data", Spaces for the Future, Routledge, pp. 164–173, doi:10.4324/9780203735657-16, ISBN 978-0-203-73565-7
- Johnson, Deborah G.; Noorman, Merel (December 14, 2013), "Artefactual Agency and Artefactual Moral Agency", Philosophy of Engineering and Technology, Dordrecht: Springer Netherlands, pp. 143–158, doi:10.1007/978-94-007-7914-3_9, ISBN 978-94-007-7913-6
- Regan, Priscilla M.; Johnson, Deborah G. (2012), "Privacy and Trust in Socio-technical Systems of Accountability", Managing Privacy through Accountability, London: Palgrave Macmillan UK, pp. 125–142, doi:10.1057/9781137032225_7, ISBN 978-1-349-35045-2
- Johnson, Deborah G. (2012). "When Transparency Isn't Transparent". In Fuchs, Christian (ed.). Internet and surveillance: the challenges of Web 2.0 and social media. Routledge studies in science, technology and society. New York: Routledge. doi:10.4324/9780203806432-14 (inactive September 3, 2025). ISBN 978-0-415-89160-8.
- Johnson, Deborah G. (2011), "Software Agents, Anticipatory Ethics, and Accountability", The Growing Gap Between Emerging Technologies and Legal-Ethical Oversight, The International Library of Ethics, Law and Technology, vol. 7, Dordrecht: Springer Netherlands, pp. 61–76, doi:10.1007/978-94-007-1356-7_5, ISBN 978-94-007-1355-0
- Johnson, Deborah G. (2010). "Sorting out the question of feminist technology". philpapers.org.
- Johnson, Deborah G. (2010). "Surveillance and transparency as sociotechnical systems of accountability". In Haggerty, Kevin D.; Samatas, Mēnas (eds.). Surveillance and democracy. New York: Routledge. doi:10.4324/9780203852156-8 (inactive September 3, 2025). ISBN 978-0-203-85215-6.
- Johnson, Deborah G.; Powers, Thomas M. (March 31, 2008), "Computers as Surrogate Agents", Information Technology and Moral Philosophy, Cambridge University Press, pp. 251–269, doi:10.1017/cbo9780511498725.014, ISBN 978-0-521-85549-5
- Johnson, Deborah G. (2008). "STS and Ethics: Implications for Engineering Ethics.". In Hackett, Edward J.; Society for Social Studies of Science (eds.). The handbook of science and technology studies (3rd ed.). Cambridge, Mass: MIT Press : Published in cooperation with the Society for the Social Studies of Science. ISBN 978-0-262-08364-5.

=== Journal articles ===
- Diakopoulos, Nicholas; Johnson, Deborah (July 1, 2021). "Anticipating and addressing the ethical implications of deepfakes in the context of elections". New Media & Society. 23 (7): 2072–2098. doi:10.1177/1461444820925811. ISSN 1461-4448.
- Johnson, Deborah G.; Verdicchio, Mario (September 11, 2019). "Constructing the Meaning of Humanoid Sex Robots". International Journal of Social Robotics. 12 (2): 415–424. doi:10.1007/s12369-019-00586-z. ISSN 1875-4791.
- Johnson, Deborah G.; Verdicchio, Mario (January 11, 2018). "AI, agency and responsibility: the VW fraud case and beyond". AI & Society. 34 (3): 639–647. doi:10.1007/s00146-017-0781-9. hdl:10446/127360. ISSN 0951-5666.
- Johnson, Deborah G.; Verdicchio, Mario (September 24, 2018). "Why robots should not be treated like animals". Ethics and Information Technology. 20 (4): 291–301. doi:10.1007/s10676-018-9481-5. hdl:10446/128488. ISSN 1388-1957.
- Johnson, D. G. (2017). "Can engineering ethics be taught?". philpapers.org.
- Johnson, Deborah G.; Verdicchio, Mario (January 9, 2017). "Reframing AI Discourse". Minds and Machines. 27 (4): 575–590. doi:10.1007/s11023-017-9417-6. ISSN 0924-6495.
- Johnson, Deborah G.; Verdicchio, Mario (June 22, 2017). "AI Anxiety". Journal of the Association for Information Science and Technology. 68 (9): 2267–2270. doi:10.1002/asi.23867. hdl:10446/127364. ISSN 2330-1635.
- Johnson, Deborah G. (May 22, 2014). "Technology with No Human Responsibility?". Journal of Business Ethics. 127 (4): 707–715. doi:10.1007/s10551-014-2180-1. ISSN 0167-4544.
- Noorman, Merel; Johnson, Deborah G. (February 18, 2014). "Negotiating autonomy and responsibility in military robots". Ethics and Information Technology. 16 (1): 51–62. doi:10.1007/s10676-013-9335-0. ISSN 1388-1957.
