= James H. Moor =

American philosopher (1942–2024)

- Born: James Haller Moor; November 2, 1942
- Died: September 11, 2024 (aged 81)
- Citizenship: American
- Education: Ohio State University; University of Chicago; Indiana University Bloomington
- Occupations: ethicist and moral philosopher
- Years active: 1972-2024
- Employer: Dartmouth College
- Known for: work in computer ethics

James Haller Moor (November 2, 1942 – September 11, 2024) was an American ethicist and moral philosopher, and is especially known for his pioneering work in computer ethics. He spent most of his career at Dartmouth College, where he was the Daniel P. Stone Professor of Intellectual and Moral Philosophy.

== Education and career ==
Moor studied mathematics at the Ohio State University, where he obtained a bachelor's degree in 1965. He went on to study philosophy at the University of Chicago, where he obtained a masters' degree. He worked as a teaching fellow at Findlay College before embarking on further studies at Indiana University Bloomington, where he earned his Ph.D. in the philosophy of science in 1972. His thesis titled Computer Consciousness was supervised by Wesley C. Salmon. Moor joined Dartmouth College in the same year as an assistant professor in philosophy. He became an associate professor in 1978 and a professor in 1985. Moor's 1985 paper entitled "What is Computer Ethics?" established him as one of the pioneering theoreticians in the field of computer ethics. Since 2009 at Dartmouth, Moor was the Daniel P. Stone Professor of Intellectual and Moral Philosophy, a title he held until his death.

Moor was the editor-in-chief of Minds and Machines (2001-2010), a peer-reviewed academic journal covering artificial intelligence, philosophy, and cognitive science.

== Research ==
Moor's research includes study in philosophy of artificial intelligence, philosophy of mind, philosophy of science, and logic. He has also written extensively on the Turing Test. In a 2009 paper, Moor listed four kinds of robots in relation to ethics. A machine can be more than one type of agent.

- Ethical impact agents: machine systems carrying an ethical impact whether intended or not. Moor gives the example of a watch causing a worker to be on work on time. As well as Ethical impact agents there are Unethical impact agents. Certain agents can be unethical impact agents at certain times and ethical impact agents at other times.
- Implicit ethical agents: machines constrained to avoid unethical outcomes.
- Explicit ethical agents: Machines which have algorithms to act ethical.
- Full ethical agents: Machines that are ethical in the same way humans are (i.e. have free will, consciousness and intentionality)

Moor gives the example of what he calls a 'Goodman agent', named after philosopher Nelson Goodman. The Goodman agent compares dates "this was generated by programming yearly dates using only the last two digits of the year, which resulted in dates beyond 2000 being misleadingly treated as earlier than those in the late twentieth century. Thus the Goodman agent was an ethical impact agent before 2000, and an unethical impact agent thereafter."

Moor has criticised Asimov's Three Laws of Robotics saying that if applied thoroughly they would produce unexpected results. He gives the example of a robot roaming the world trying to prevent harm from all humans.

In 2001, Moor identified the virtuality fallacy, an informal fallacy asserting that things that exist only in a virtual context are not real or do not have real effects. Moor has stated that this fallacy is used by people in defending their questionable behavior on the internet.

== Awards ==
- SIGCAS Making a Difference Award, 2003
- Barwise Prize, 2006
- Weizenbaum Award, 2017
- Future of Life Award, 2024

== Bibliography ==
=== Selected publications ===
- Moor, James H. (1978). "Three Myths of Computer Science". The British Journal for the Philosophy of Science. 29 (3): 213–222. doi:10.1093/bjps/29.3.213. ISSN 0007-0882.
- Moor, James H. (1985). "What Is Computer Ethics?". Metaphilosophy. 16 (4): 266–275. doi:10.1111/j.1467-9973.1985.tb00173.x. ISSN 0026-1068.
- Moor, James H. (1997). "Towards a theory of privacy in the information age". ACM SIGCAS Computers and Society. 27 (3): 27–32. doi:10.1145/270858.270866. ISSN 0095-2737.
- Moor, James H. (2006). "The Nature, Importance, and Difficulty of Machine Ethics". IEEE Intelligent Systems. 21 (4): 18–21. doi:10.1109/MIS.2006.80. ISSN 1541-1672.
- Warwick, Kevin; Shah, Huma; Moor, James (2013). "Some Implications of a Sample of Practical Turing Tests". Minds and Machines. 23 (2): 163–177. doi:10.1007/s11023-013-9301-y. ISSN 0924-6495.

=== Books ===
- Bynum, Terrell Ward; Moor, James, eds. (2000). The digital phoenix: how computers are changing philosophy (Revised ed.). Oxford: Blackwell. ISBN 978-0-631-20352-0.
- Moor, James; Bynum, Terrell Ward, eds. (2002). Cyberphilosophy: the intersection of philosophy and computing. Metaphilosophy series in philosophy. Oxford: Blackwell. ISBN 978-1-4051-0073-1.
- Moor, James H., ed. (2003). The Turing Test: The Elusive Standard of Artificial Intelligence. Studies in Cognitive Systems. Vol. 30. Dordrecht: Springer Netherlands. doi:10.1007/978-94-010-0105-2. ISBN 978-1-4020-1205-1.
- Allhoff, Fritz; Lin, Patrick; Moor, James; Weckert, John, eds. (2007). Nanoethics: the ethical and social implications of nanotechnology. Hoboken, NJ: Wiley-Interscience. ISBN 978-0-470-08417-5.
- Bergmann, Merrie; Moor, James; Nelson, Jack (2009). The logic book (5th ed.). Boston: McGraw-Hill Higher Education. ISBN 978-0-07-353563-0.
- Eden, Amnon H.; Moor, James H.; Søraker, Johnny H.; Steinhart, Eric, eds. (2012). Singularity Hypotheses: A Scientific and Philosophical Assessment. The Frontiers Collection. Berlin, Heidelberg: Springer Berlin Heidelberg. doi:10.1007/978-3-642-32560-1. ISBN 978-3-642-32559-5.
