= Donald Gotterbarn =

Donald William Gotterbarn is a computer ethics researcher. Gotterbarn received his Ph.D. in Philosophy in 1971 from the University of Rochester. He also earned his M. Div. from the Colgate Rochester Divinity School.

== Professional career ==
Gotterbarn is an author of the Software Engineering Code of Ethics and Professional Practice which promotes ethics among software engineers. He is the chair of the Association for Computing Machinery Committee on Professional Ethics.

Gotterbarn is a Professor Emeritus at East Tennessee State University in Johnson City, TN.

== Awards ==
ACM SIGCAS Making a Difference Award, 2002
For research and work regarding computer and software engineering ethics.
Outstanding Contribution to the ACM Award, 2005
"for exceptional accomplishments and leadership as both an educator and practitioner, in establishing the ACM's Codes of Ethics and promoting the ethical behavior of computing professionals and organizations."
Weizenbaum Award, 2010
"for his role in developing the moral consciousness of the profession."

== See also ==
- Computer ethics
