= Ray Turner (computer scientist) =

British computer scientist

Raymond Turner
- Born: 28 April 1947 (age 79); England
- Occupation: Logician
- Employer: University of Essex
- Known for: Publications on logic in computer science and the philosophy of computer science

Professor Raymond Turner (born 28 April 1947) is an English logician, philosopher, and theoretical computer scientist based at the University of Essex. He is best known for his work on logic in computer science and for his pioneering work in the philosophy of computer science. He is on the editorial boards for the Journal of Logic and Computation and the Stanford Encyclopedia of Philosophy, for Logic, Computation, and Agency.

== Books ==
- Logics for Artificial Intelligence, 121 pages, E. Horwood, 1984, ISBN 0-470-20123-1
- Truth and Modality for Knowledge Representation, 141 pages, The MIT Press, 1991,ISBN 0-262-20080-5
- Constructive Foundations for Functional Languages, 288 pages, McGraw-Hill Publishing Co, 1 May 1991, ISBN 0-07-707411-4
- Computable Models, 240 pages, Springer, 2009, ISBN 1-84882-051-8
- Computational Artefacts: Towards a Philosophy of Computer Science, 285 pages, Springer, 2018, ISBN 978-3-662-55565-1

== Selected Papers ==
- A theory of properties, The Journal of Symbolic Logic. 52 (02), 455–472.
- Counterfactuals without possible worlds, Journal of Philosophical Logic. 10 (4), 453–493.
- Logics of truth, Notre Dame Journal of Formal Logic. 31 (2), 308–329.
- Understanding programming languages, Minds and Machines. 17 (2), 203–216.
- The Foundations of Specification Journal of Logic and Computation. 15 (5), 623–662.
- Semantics and stratification, Journal of Logic and Computation. 15 (2), 145–158.
- Type inference for set theory, Theoretical Computer Science. 266 (1–2), 951–974.
- Reading between the lines in constructive type theory, Journal of Logic and Computation. 7 (2), 229–250.
- Weak theories of operations and types, Journal of Logic and Computation. 6 (1), 5–31.
- Lazy theories of operations and types, Journal of Logic and Computation. 3 (1), 77–102.
- Philosophy of computer science, Stanford Encyclopedia of Philosophy, .
- Specification, Minds and Machines, 21 (2):135–152.
- Types, in Handbook of Logic and Language. 1st Edition. Editors: J. van Benthem A. ter Meulen. ISBN 9780080533087.

== Awards ==
Covey award 2017..
