= Selmer Bringsjord =

American computer and cognitive scientist

- Born: November 24, 1958 (age 67)

Academic background
- Education: University of Pennsylvania (BS); Brown University (PhD)
- Thesis: The Failure of Computationalism (1987)
- Doctoral advisor: Roderick Chisholm

Academic work
- Discipline: Artificial Intelligence
- Sub-discipline: Automated Reasoning
- Institutions: Rensselaer Polytechnic Institute

Selmer Bringsjord (born November 24, 1958) is a professor of computer science and cognitive science and a former chair of the Department of Cognitive Science at Rensselaer Polytechnic Institute. He also holds an appointment in the Lally School of Management & Technology and teaches artificial Intelligence (AI), formal logic, human and machine reasoning, and philosophy of AI.

== Biography ==
Bringsjord's education includes a B.A. in philosophy from the University of Pennsylvania and a Ph.D. in philosophy from Brown University, where he studied under Roderick Chisholm. He conducts research in AI as the director of the Rensselaer AI & Reasoning (RAIR) Laboratory. He specializes in the logico-mathematical and philosophical foundations of AI and cognitive science, and in collaboratively building AI systems on the basis of computational logic.

Bringsjord believes that "the human mind will forever be superior to AI", and that "much of what many humans do for a living will be better done by indefatigable machines who require not a cent in pay". Bringsjord has stated that the "ultimate growth industry will be building smarter and smarter such machines on the one hand, and philosophizing about whether they are truly conscious and free on the other".

Bringsjord has an argument for P = NP using digital physics. Other research includes developing a new computational-logic framework allowing the formalization of deliberative multi-agent "mindreading" as applied to the realm of nuclear strategy, with the goal of creating a model and simulation to enable reliable prediction. He has published an opinion piece advocating for counter-terrorism security ensured by pervasive, all-seeing sensors; automated reasoners; and autonomous, lethal robots.

Bringsjord received a National Science Foundation award to research Social Robotics and the Covey Award for the advancement of philosophy of computing awarded by the International Association for Computing And Philosophy, among several others prizes.

== Books authored ==
- with Yang, Y. Mental Metalogic: A New, Unifying Theory of Human and Machine Reasoning (Mahwah, NJ: Lawrence Erlbaum).(2007)
- with Zenzen, M. Superminds: People Harness Hypercomputation, and More (Dordrecht, The Netherlands: Kluwer). (2003) ISBN 978-1402010958
- with Ferrucci, D. Artificial Intelligence and Literary Creativity: Inside the Mind of Brutus, A Storytelling Machine (Mahwah, NJ: Lawrence Erlbaum).(2000)
- Abortion: A Dialogue (Indianapolis, IN: Hackett).(1997)
- What Robots Can and Can’t Be (Dordrecht, The Netherlands: Kluwer).(1992)
- Soft Wars (New York, NY: Penguin USA). A novel.(1991)
