= John Weckert =

Australian philosopher

John Weckert is an Australian philosopher who has contributed to the field of information and computer ethics.

He is the founder and editor-in-chief of the journal Nanoethics: Ethics for Technologies that Converge at the Nanoscale, as well as the Australian Computer Society (ACS) representative on the Technical Committee on Computers and Society. He works closely with the ACS on various projects, including developing case studies to accompany the ACS Code of Ethics, with the case studies linking to clauses outlined in the CoE. He is also the manager of the Centre for Applied Philosophy and Public Ethics (CAPPE) Program on Emerging Technologies: IT and Nanotechnology at Charles Sturt University. He is currently the Senior Professor of Information Technology in the School of Information Studies at Charles Sturt University.

== Education and profession ==
=== Qualifications ===
- Ph.D. University of Melbourne, 1985, Philosophy.
- Diploma of Computer Science, La Trobe University, 1985.
- M.A. La Trobe University, 1977, Philosophy.
- B.A. (Hons)(First class) University of Adelaide, 1974, Philosophy.

=== Positions held ===
- Professor of Computer Ethics, School of Humanities and social Sciences, Charles Sturt University
- Professorial Fellow, Centre for Applied Philosophy and Public Ethics, an ARC funded Special Research Centre
- 2003–2006: Professor of Information Technology, School of Information Studies
- October – December 2006 – Erasmus Scholar NTNU, Trondheim, Norway and Linköping University, Sweden
- January – March 2004 – Visiting Professor of Philosophy, Dartmouth College, USA
- 2000–2002: Associate Professor of Information Technology
- July 1991 –December 1999: Senior Lecturer in Information Technology
- September 1986 – July 1991: Lecturer in Computing, Charles Sturt University
- 1985–86: Lecturer in Computing/Philosophy, Melbourne College of Advanced Education
- 1977–84: Lecturer in Philosophy, Melbourne College of Advanced Education
- 1976: Senior Tutor in Philosophy, University of Western Australia
- 1975: Tutor in Philosophy, Monash University

== Contributions to information ethics ==
Weckert has contributed many ideas to Information Ethics, specifically relative to the relationship between the philosophical and applied sides of Information and Computer Ethics.

=== Trust in an online environment ===
Weckert has worked on the idea of trust within an online environment. He sums up his theories in his 2005 article, "Trust in Cyberspace". In the article, Weckert focuses on a few key issues regarding the concept of trust and if and when it may be possible in cyberspace.

== Publications ==
=== Articles ===
- Weckert, John (2007). "Giving and taking offence in a global context". International Journal of Technology and Human Interaction. 3 (3): 25–35. doi:10.4018/jthi.2007070103.
- Weckert, John; Moor, James (2006). "The precautionary principle in nanotechnology". International Journal of Applied Philosophy. 20 (2): 191–204. doi:10.5840/ijap200620214.
- Weckert, John; Dalgarno, Barney (2006). "Child pornography and deception on the Internet: some ethical considerations". Information, Communication and Ethics in Society. 4: 173–182.
- Bowern, Mike; Burmeister, Oliver; Gotterbarn, Don; Weckert, John (2006). "ICT integrity: bringing the ACS Code of Ethics up to date". Australasian Journal of Information Systems. 13 (2): 169–181. doi:10.3127/ajis.v13i2.50.
- Ferguson, Stuart; Salmond, Rachel; Al-Saggaf, Yeslam; Bowern, Mike; Weckert, John (2005). "The use of case studies in professional codes of Ethics: The relevance of the ACS experience to ALIA's Code of Ethics". Australian Library Journal. 54. doi:10.1080/00049670.2005.10721766. S2CID 108700213.
- Burmeister, Oliver K.; Weckert, John (2003). "Applying the new Software Engineering Code of Ethics to Usability Engineering". Journal of Information, Communication and Ethics in Society: 119–132. doi:10.1108/14779960380000231.
- Weckert, John; Al-Saggaf, Yeslam (2003). "Online Cultural Imperialism: Is it an Ethical Issue?". Journal of Information, Communication and Ethics in Society. 1 (1): 21–29. doi:10.1108/14779960380000223.
- Dick, Archie L.; Weckert, John (2003). ""A Philosophical Framework for Library and Information Science", by John M. Budd (A review article)". Library Quarterly. 73: 73–77. doi:10.1086/603377. S2CID 148180579.
- Weckert, John (2002). "Lilliputian computer ethics". Metaphilosophy. 33 (3): 366–375. doi:10.1111/1467-9973.00232. S2CID 144142658.
- Rooksby, Emma; Weckert, John; Lucas, Richard (2002). "The rural digital divide in Australia". Rural Society. 12: 197–210. doi:10.5172/rsj.12.3.197. S2CID 167838646.
- Weckert, John (2001). "The Control of Scientific Research: The Case of Nanotechnology". The Australian Journal of Professional and Applied Ethics.
- Weckert, John (2001). "Computer ethics: future directions". Ethics and Information Technology. 3 (2): 93–96. doi:10.1023/a:1011833607572. S2CID 27157477.
- Weckert, John (2001). "IT research and development: should there be control?". Australian Journal of Information Systems. 8: 63–67.
- Miller, Seamus; Weckert, John (2000). "Privacy, the workplace and the Internet". Journal of Business Ethics. 28 (3): 255–265. doi:10.1023/A:1006232417265. S2CID 35296871. (reprinted in Robert K. Miller above).
- Rogerson, Simon; Weckert, John; Simpson, Chris (2000). "An Ethical Review of Information Systems Development: the Australian Computer Society's Code of Ethics and SSADM". Information Technology & People. 13 (2): 121–136. doi:10.1108/09593840010339853.
- Weckert, John (2000). "What is so bad about Internet content regulation?". Ethics and Information Technology. 2 (2): 105–111. doi:10.1023/A:1010077520614. S2CID 35778772.
- Ferguson, Stuart; Weckert, John (October 1998). "Duty of care: emerging professionalism of can of worms?". The Library Quarterly.
- Scott, Jan; Weckert, John (1997). "Helping the User to Understand: Dynamic Explanations". AI Applications. 11: 19–29.
- Weckert, John (April 1997). "Intellectual property and computer software". Business Ethics: A European Review: 102–109.
- Weckert, John; Davis, Richard (1997). "Artificial Intelligence in Natural Resource Management in Australia". AI Applications. 11: 16–18.
- Weckert, John; Adeney, Douglas (February 1996). "Censorship on the World Wide Web". Australian Library Review. 13.
- Weckert, John; Ferguson, Stuart (1993). "Ethics, reference and expert systems". Australian Library Journal. 42. doi:10.1080/00049670.1993.10755642.
- Johnston, Mark; Weckert, John (1991). "Machine learning for library monograph selection". Expert Systems for Information Management. 4.
- Weckert, John (1990). "Functionalism's impotence". Philosophical Inquiry. 12: 32–43. doi:10.5840/philinquiry1990121/23.
- Weckert, John; Cooper, Clare (1990). "Artificial intelligence, expert systems and librarianship: a review of the literature". Australian Library Review. 7.
- Johnston, Mark; Weckert, John (1990). "Selection advise: an expert system for collection development". Information Technology and Libraries. 9.
- John, Weckert; Cooper, Clare (1989). "Expert systems and libraries". Riverina Library Review. 6.
- Weckert, John (1986). "The theory-ladenness of observations". Studies in History and Philosophy of Science. 17 (1): 115–127. Bibcode:1986SHPSA..17..115W. doi:10.1016/0039-3681(86)90021-X.
- Weckert, John (1986). "Putnam, reference and essentialism". Dialogue. 25 (3): 509–521. doi:10.1017/S0012217300020916. S2CID 170618145.
- Weckert, John (1984). "Is relativism self-refuting?". Educational Philosophy and Theory. 16 (2): 29–42. doi:10.1111/j.1469-5812.1984.tb00106.x.

=== Books ===
- Moor, James; Weckert, John (2007). Nanoethics: The Ethical and Social Implications of Nanotechnology. MIT Press.
- van den Hoven, Jeroen; Weckert, John, eds. (2007). Information Technology and Moral Philosophy. Cambridge University Press.
- Weckert, John, ed. (2007). Computer Ethics. Ashgate.
- Allhoff, Fritz; Lin, Patrick; Moor, James; et al., eds. (2007). Nanotechnology: A Maelstrom of Ethical and Social Issues. Wiley.
- Rooksby, Emma; Weckert, John, eds. (2007). Information Technology and Social Justice. Idea Group.
- Weckert, John, ed. (2004). Electronic Monitoring in the Workplace: Controversies and Solutions. Idea Group.
- Weckert, John; Al-Saggaf, Yeslam (eds), Selected papers from the Computers and Philosophy (CAP) conference, The Australian National University, 13 October – 2 November 2003. CRPIT, vol 37: Australian Computer Society, Sydney.
- Weckert, John; McDonald, Craig, eds. (1992). Intelligent Library Systems: Proceedings of the Intelligent Library Systems conference, Charles Sturt University, September, 1992. Centre for Information Studies (CSU).
- McDonald, Craig; Weckert, John, eds. (1991). Libraries and Expert Systems. London: Taylor Graham. (Proceedings of the Libraries and Expert Systems conference, Charles Sturt University – Riverina, July 1990).

== See also ==
- Trust: Trust in an online environment
- Cheating: Cheating in an online environment
