= Shannon Vallor =

Philosopher of technology

Shannon Vallor FRSE
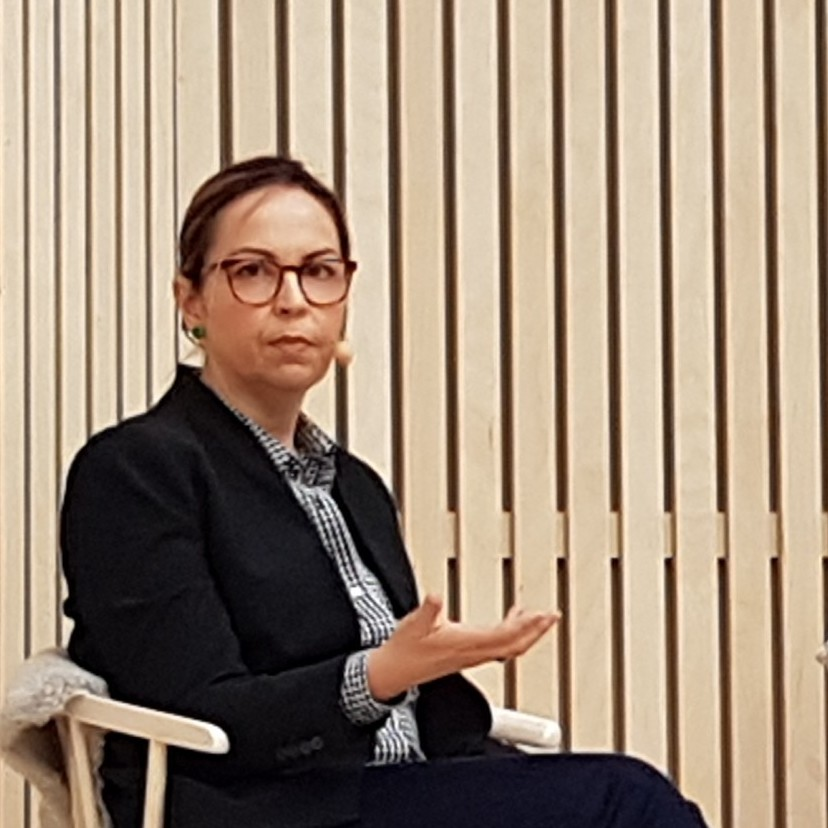

Education
- Education: Boston College (PhD)

Philosophical work
- Era: 21st-century philosophy
- Region: Western philosophy
- School: Analytic philosophy
- Institutions: University of Edinburgh; University of San Francisco; Santa Clara University
- Main interests: Philosophy of technology Applied ethics Philosophy of science
- Website: www.shannonvallor.net

Shannon Vallor is an American philosopher of technology. She is the Baillie Gifford Chair in the Ethics of Data and Artificial Intelligence at the Edinburgh Futures Institute. She previously taught at Santa Clara University in Santa Clara, California where she was the Regis and Dianne McKenna Professor of Philosophy and William J. Rewak, S.J. Professor at SCU. She is on the scientific advisory committee of the Schwartz Reisman Institute for Technology and Society.

== Education and career ==
Vallor earned her PhD in philosophy from Boston College in 2001.

While obtaining her PhD at Boston College, Vallor was a teaching fellow from 1997–1999 in the department of philosophy. She was a lecturer at the University of San Francisco from 2001–2003. Vallor was appointed a professor in the philosophy department of Santa Clara University in 2003. Since 2020 she has been the first Baillie Gifford Chair in the Ethics of Data and Artificial Intelligence at the Edinburgh Futures Institute (EFI) at the University of Edinburgh.

In addition to her academic career, Vallor also serves as a consulting AI Ethicist for Google's Cloud AI program. She has formerly served as president of the Society for Philosophy and Technology, is a member of the advisory board for Capita Social, and co-director and Secretary of the Board of the Foundation for Responsible Robotics, a not for profit non-government organization that advocates for the ethical design and production of robots. Vallor is also a scholar at the Markkula Center for Applied Ethics, where she and Princeton computer scientist Arvind Narayanan created a free, online module called "An Introduction to Software Engineering Ethics." She received the World Technology Award in Ethics in 2015, and in 2017 received both the Public Intellectual Award and President's Special Recognition Award from Santa Clara University.

Vallor has authored numerous articles on ethical issues in emerging technology, as well as the books, "Technology and the Virtues: A Philosophical Guide to a Future Worth Wanting"., and "The AI Mirror: How to Reclaim Our Humanity in an Age of Machine Thinking".

== Selected works ==
=== Books ===
- Vallor, Shannon (2024). AI Mirror. Oxford University Press. ISBN 978-0-19-775906-6
- Vallor, Shannon (2016). Technology and the Virtues: A Philosophical Guide to a Future Worth Wanting. Oxford University Press. ISBN 978-0-19-049851-1

=== Journal articles ===
- Vallor, Shannon (2010). "Social Networking Technology and the Virtues," Ethics and Information Technology 12:2, 157–170.
- Vallor, Shannon (2011). "Knowing What to Wish For: Human Enhancement Technology, Dignity and Virtue," Techne 15:2, 82–100.
- Vallor, Shannon (2011). "Carebots and Caregivers: Sustaining the Ethical Ideal of Care in the 21st Century," Philosophy and Technology 24:3, 251–268.
- Vallor, Shannon (2012). "Flourishing on Facebook: Virtue Friendship and New Social Media," Ethics and Information Technology 14:3, 185–199.
- Vallor, Shannon (2014). "Armed Robots and Military Virtue," in The Ethics of Information Warfare, eds. Floridi and Taddeo (Springer) ISBN 978-3-319-04135-3
- Vallor, Shannon (2015). "Moral Deskilling and Upskilling in a New Machine Age: Reflections on the Ambiguous Future of Character," Philosophy and Technology. 28: (2015), 107–124.

=== Encyclopedia articles ===
- Vallor, Shannon (2012; Revised 2015). "Social Networking and Ethics," Stanford Encyclopedia of Philosophy. ISSN 1095-5054
