= Information ethics =

Branch of ethics

Information ethics has been defined as "the branch of ethics that focuses on the relationship between the creation, organization, dissemination, and use of information, and the ethical standards and moral codes governing human conduct in society". It examines the morality that comes from information as a resource, a product, or as a target. It provides a critical framework for considering moral issues concerning informational privacy, moral agency (e.g. whether artificial agents may be moral), new environmental issues (especially how agents should behave in the infosphere), problems arising from the life-cycle (creation, collection, recording, distribution, processing, etc.) of information (especially ownership and copyright, digital divide, and digital rights). It is very vital to understand that librarians, archivists, information professionals among others, really understand the importance of knowing how to disseminate proper information as well as being responsible with their actions when addressing information.

Information ethics has evolved to relate to a range of fields such as computer ethics, medical ethics, journalism and the philosophy of information. As the use and creation of information and data form the foundation of machine learning, artificial intelligence and many areas of mathematics, information ethics also plays a central role in the ethics of artificial intelligence, big data ethics and ethics in mathematics.

== History ==
The term information ethics was first coined by Robert Hauptman and used in the book Ethical Challenges in Librarianship. The field of information ethics has a relatively short but progressive history having been recognized in the United States for nearly 20 years. The origins of the field are in librarianship though it has now expanded to the consideration of ethical issues in other domains including computer science, the internet, media, journalism, management information systems, and business.

Evidence of scholarly work on this subject can be traced to the 1980s, when an article authored by Barbara J. Kostrewski and Charles Oppenheim and published in the Journal of Information Science, discussed issues relating to the field including confidentiality, information biases, and quality control. Another scholar, Robert Hauptman, has also written extensively about information ethics in the library field and founded the Journal of Information Ethics in 1992.

One of the first schools to introduce an Information Ethics course was the University of Pittsburgh in 1990. The course was a master's level course on the concept of Information Ethics. Soon after, Kent State University also introduced a master's level course called "Ethical Concerns For Library and Information Professionals." Eventually, the term "Information Ethics" became more associated with the computer science and information technology disciplines in university. Still however, it is uncommon for universities to devote entire courses to the subject. Due to the nature of technology, the concept of information ethics has spread to other realms in the industry. Thus, concepts such as "cyberethics," a concept which discusses topics such as the ethics of artificial intelligence and its ability to reason, and media ethics which applies to concepts such as lies, censorship, and violence in the press. Therefore, due to the advent of the internet, the concept of information ethics has been spread to other fields other than librarianship now that information has become so readily available. Information has become more relevant now than ever now that the credibility of information online is more blurry than print articles due to the ease of publishing online articles. All of these different concepts have been embraced by the International Center for Information Ethics (ICIE), established by Rafael Capurro in 1999.

Dilemmas regarding the life of information are becoming increasingly important in a society that is defined as "the information society". The explosion of so much technology has brought information ethics to a forefront in ethical considerations. Information transmission and literacy are essential concerns in establishing an ethical foundation that promotes fair, equitable, and responsible practices. Information ethics broadly examines issues related to ownership, access, privacy, security, and community. It is also concerned with relational issues such as "the relationship between information and the good of society, the relationship between information providers and the consumers of information".

Information technology affects common issues such as copyright protection, intellectual freedom, accountability, privacy, and security. Many of these issues are difficult or impossible to resolve due to fundamental tensions between Western moral philosophies (based on rules, democracy, individual rights, and personal freedoms) and the traditional Eastern cultures (based on relationships, hierarchy, collective responsibilities, and social harmony). The multi-faceted dispute between Google and the government of the People's Republic of China reflects some of these fundamental tensions.

Professional codes offer a basis for making ethical decisions and applying ethical solutions to situations involving information provision and use which reflect an organization's commitment to responsible information service. Evolving information formats and needs require continual reconsideration of ethical principles and how these codes are applied. Considerations regarding information ethics influence "personal decisions, professional practice, and public policy". Therefore, ethical analysis must provide a framework to take into consideration "many, diverse domains" (ibid.) regarding how information is distributed.

== Censorship ==
Censorship is an issue commonly involved in the discussion of information ethics because it describes the inability to access or express opinions or information based on the belief it is bad for others to view this opinion or information. Sources that are commonly censored include books, articles, speeches, art work, data, music and photos. Censorship can be perceived both as ethical and non-ethical in the field of information ethics.

Those who believe censorship is ethical say the practice prevents readers from being exposed to offensive and objectionable material. Topics such as sexism, racism, homophobia, and anti-semitism are present in public works and are widely seen as unethical in the public eye. There is concern regarding the exposure of these topics to the world, especially the young generation. The Australian Library Journal states proponents for censorship in libraries, the practice of librarians deciphering which books/ resources to keep in their libraries, argue the act of censorship is an ethical way to provide information to the public that is considered morally sound, allowing positive ethics instead of negative ethics to be dispersed. According to the same journal, librarians have an "ethical duty" to protect the minds, particularly young people, of those who read their books through the lens of censorship to prevent the readers from adopting the unethical ideas and behaviors portrayed in the books.

However, others in the field of information ethics argue the practice of censorship is unethical because it fails to provide all available information to the community of readers. British philosopher John Stuart Mill argued censorship is unethical because it goes directly against the moral concept of utilitarianism. Mill believes humans are unable to have true beliefs when information is withheld from the population via censorship and acquiring true beliefs without censorship leads to greater happiness. According to this argument, true beliefs and happiness (of which both concepts are considered ethical) cannot be obtained through the practice of censorship. Librarians and others who disperse information to the public also face the dilemma of the ethics of censorship through the argument that censorship harms students and is morally wrong because they are unable to know the full extent of knowledge available to the world. The debate of information ethics in censorship was highly contested when schools removed information about evolution from libraries and curriculums due to the topic conflicting with religious beliefs. In this case, advocates against ethics in censorship argue it is more ethical to include multiple sources information on a subject, such as creation, to allow the reader to learn and decipher their beliefs.

== Ethics of downloading ==
Illegal downloading has also caused some ethical concerns and raised the question whether digital piracy is equivalent to stealing or not. When asked the question "Is it ethical to download copyrighted music for free?" in a survey, 44 percent of a group of primarily college-aged students responded "Yes."

Christian Barry believes that understanding illegal downloading as equivalent to common theft is problematic, because clear and morally relevant differences can be shown "between stealing someone’s handbag and illegally downloading a television series". On the other hand, he thinks consumers should try to respect intellectual property unless doing so imposes unreasonable cost on them.

In an article titled "Download This Essay: A Defence of Stealing Ebooks", Andrew Forcehimes argues that the way we think about copyrights is inconsistent, because every argument for (physical) public libraries is also an argument for illegally downloading ebooks and every argument against downloading ebooks would also be an argument against libraries. In a reply, Sadulla Karjiker argues that "economically, there is a material difference between permitting public libraries making physical books available and allowing such online distribution of ebooks." Ali Pirhayati has proposed a thought experiment based on a high-tech library to neutralize the magnitude problem (suggested by Karjiker), and justify Forcehimes’ main idea.

== Security and privacy ==
Ethical concerns regarding international security, surveillance, and the right to privacy are on the rise. The issues of security and privacy commonly overlap in the field of information, due to the interconnectedness of online research and the development of Information Technology (IT). Some of the areas surrounding security and privacy are identity theft, online economic transfers, medical records, and state security. Companies, organizations, and institutions use databases to store, organize, and distribute user's information—with or without their knowledge.

Individuals are far more likely to part with personal information when it seems that they will have some sort of control over the use of the information or if the information is given to an entity that they already have an established relationship with. In these specific circumstances, subjects will be much inclined to believe that their information has been collected for pure collection's sake. An entity may also be offering goods or services in exchange for the client's personal information. This type of collection method may seem valuable to a user due to the fact that the transaction appears to be free in the monetary sense. This forms a type of social contract between the entity offering the goods or services and the client. The client may continue to uphold their side of the contract as long as the company continues to provide them with a good or service that they deem worthy. The concept of procedural fairness indicates an individual's perception of fairness in a given scenario. Circumstances that contribute to procedural fairness are providing the customer with the ability to voice their concerns or input, and control over the outcome of the contract.

Best practice for any company collecting information from customers is to consider procedural fairness. This concept is a key proponent of ethical consumer marketing and is the basis of United States Privacy Laws, the European Union's privacy directive from 1995, and the Clinton Administration's June 1995 guidelines for personal information use by all National Information Infrastructure participants. An individual being allowed to remove their name from a mailing list is considered a best information collecting practice. In a few Equifax surveys conducted in the years 1994–1996, it was found that a substantial amount of the American public was concerned about business practices using private consumer information, and that is causes more harm than good. Throughout the course of a customer-company relationship, the company can likely accumulate a plethora of information from its customer. With data processing technology flourishing, it allows for the company to make specific marketing campaigns for each of their individual customers. Data collection and surveillance infrastructure has allowed companies to micro-target specific groups and tailor advertisements for certain populations.

=== Medical records ===
A recent trend of medical records is to digitize them. The sensitive information secured within medical records makes security measures vitally important. The ethical concern of medical record security is great within the context of emergency wards, where any patient records can be accessed at all times. Within an emergency ward, patient medical records need to be available for quick access; however, this means that all medical records can be accessed at any moment within emergency wards with or without the patient present.

Ironically, the donation of one's body organs "to science" is easier in most Western jurisdictions than donating one's medical records for research.

=== International security ===
Warfare has also changed the security of countries within the 21st Century. After the events of 9-11 and other terrorism attacks on civilians, surveillance by states raises ethical concerns of the individual privacy of citizens. The USA PATRIOT Act 2001 is a prime example of such concerns. Many other countries, especially European nations within the current climate of terrorism, is looking for a balancing between stricter security and surveillance, and not committing the same ethical concerns associated with the USA Patriot Act. International security is moving to towards the trends of cybersecurity and unmanned systems, which involve the military application of IT. Ethical concerns of political entities regarding information warfare include the unpredictability of response, difficulty differentiating civilian and military targets, and conflict between state and non-state actors.

== Journals ==
The main, peer-reviewed, academic journals reporting on information ethics are the Journal of the Association for Information Systems, the flagship publication of the Association for Information Systems, and Ethics and Information Technology, published by Springer.

== Branches ==
- Bioinformatics
- Business ethics
- Computer ethics
- Cyberethics
- Information ecology
- Library Bill of Rights
- Media ethics

== See also ==
- Data ethics
- Digital ethics
- Information governance
- Library and information science
- Media literacy
- Research ethics
