= Kenneth Einar Himma =

American lawyer

- Born: Seattle
- Education: Doctor of law (University of Washington School of Law), Doctor of philosophy (University of Washington)
- Occupations: Philosopher, author, academic, lawyer, lecturer

Kenneth Einar Himma is an American philosopher, author, lawyer, academic and lecturer.

== Early life and education ==
Born in Seattle, Himma earned his bachelor's degree from the University of Illinois in 1985, his master's from the University of California in 1987, and his doctorate of law from the University of Washington School of Law in 1990, before receiving his PhD in 2001 from the University of Washington for his thesis, "The Status of Legal Principles".

== Academic career ==
Himma specialises in philosophy of law, philosophy of information, information ethics, social philosophy, political philosophy and philosophy of religion, and has authored dozens of academic papers in these fields. From 2004 until 2011 he worked as a professor in the philosophy department of Seattle Pacific University, after which he began lecturing part-time at the University of Washington School of Law. He is currently a continuing guest professor at the Faculty of Law of the University of Zagreb.

== Publications ==
He is the author of Coercion and the Nature of Law (Oxford University Press, 2020), Morality and the Nature of Law (Oxford University Press, 2019), and The Nature of Authority (Cambridge University Press, 2024).

== Editorial roles ==
He also serves on the editorial boards of a number of journals in the philosophy of information. In 2007, Himma was elected to the editorial board of the Journal of Information Ethics and the board of directors for the International Society for Ethics and Information Technology. He currently serves on the Editorial Advisory Boards of the Journal of Information, Communication and Ethics in Society and the International Review of Information Ethics and the Editorial Boards of Computers and Society and the International Journal of Cyber Ethics in Education. He is also on editorial boards of Legal Theory, Law and Philosophy, Ratio Juris, Revus: A Journal for Constitutional Theory and Philosophy of Law.

== Awards and recognition ==
In 2010, he was nominated for the World Technology Network's World Technology Award for Ethics, and in 2012, he was awarded a Fulbright Candidate Grant for Keynote at IVR Conference at Faculty of Law at University of Belgrade.

== Other writing ==
Himma has had numerous opinion pieces published in The Seattle Times. He has also contributed several entries to the Internet Encyclopedia of Philosophy, with commentary on the subjects of legal and religious philosophy. Some of his scholarly papers have attracted responses and commentaries from Francis J. Beckwith, Thomas Metzinger, Greg Dawes, Alison Adam, David Gunkel, Mark Coeckelbergh, Matthew Kramer and Scott J. Shapiro.

== Partial bibliography ==
=== Books ===
- Himma, Kenneth Einar (2004). Law, Morality, and Legal Positivism: Proceedings of the 21st World Congress of the International Association for Philosophy of Law and Social Philosophy (IVR); Lund, Sweden, 12-18 August 2003. Lund: Franz Steiner Verlag. ISBN 978-3-515-08513-7.
- Himma, Kenneth Einar (2005). Internet Security: Hacking, Counterhacking, and Society. Mississauga: Jones and Bartlett Publishers, Inc. ISBN 978-0-7637-3536-4.
- Himma, Kenneth Einar; Bix, Brian, eds. (2005). Law and Morality. Oxford: Routledge. ISBN 978-0-7546-2577-3.
- Himma, Kenneth Einar; Tavani, Herman T., eds. (2008). The Handbook of Information and Computer Ethics. Hoboken: John Wiley & Sons.
- Adler, Matthew; Himma, Kenneth Einar, eds. (2009). The Rule of Recognition and the U.S. Constitution. New York: Oxford University Press.
- Flores, Imer B.; Himma, Kenneth Einar, eds. (2013). Law, Liberty, and the Rule of Law. Dordrecht: Springer Science+Business Media. ISBN 978-94-007-4742-5.
