= Guns don't kill people, people kill people =

Gun-rights slogan

Variations in use

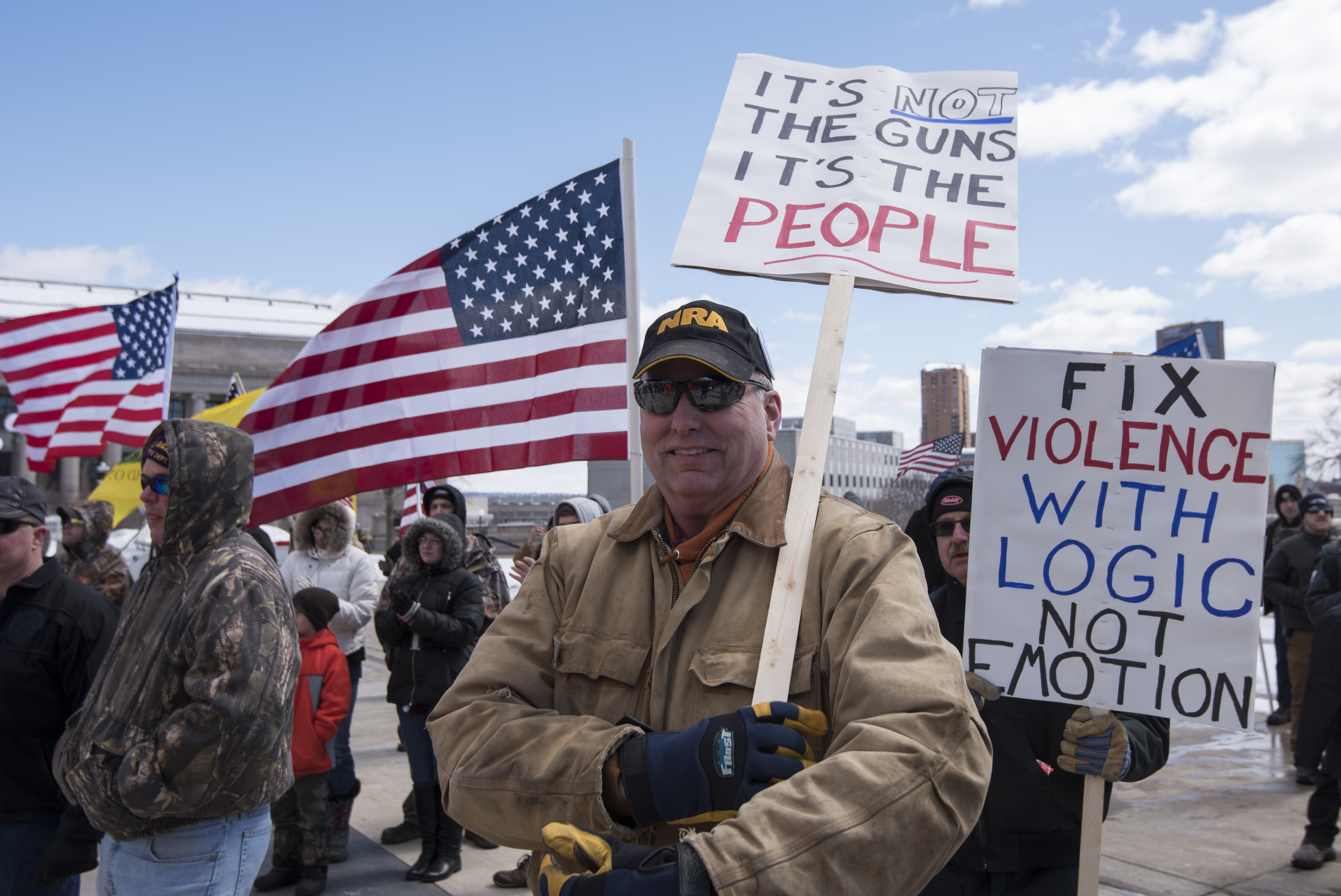
"It's not the guns, it's the people"

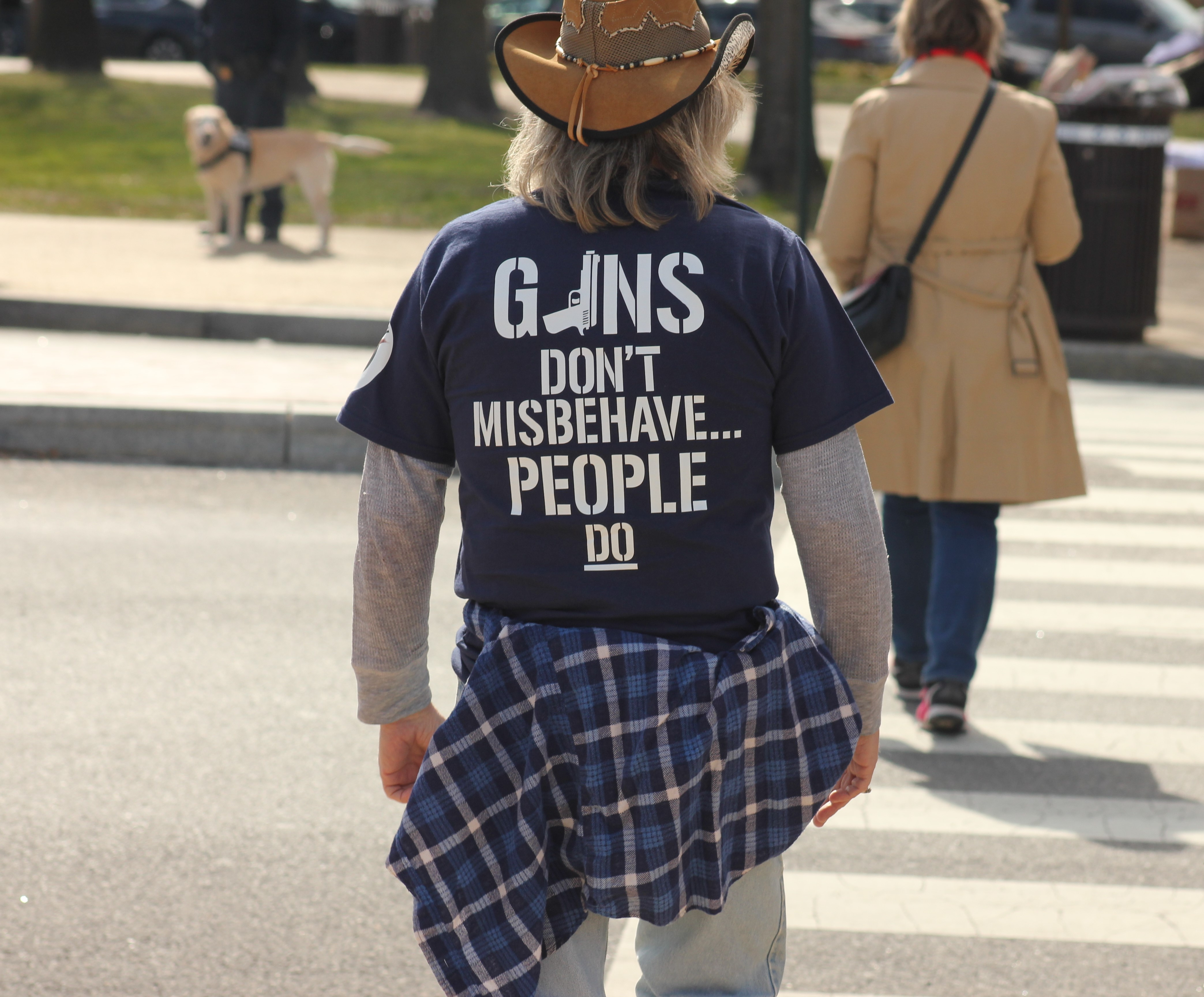
"Guns don't misbehave, people do"

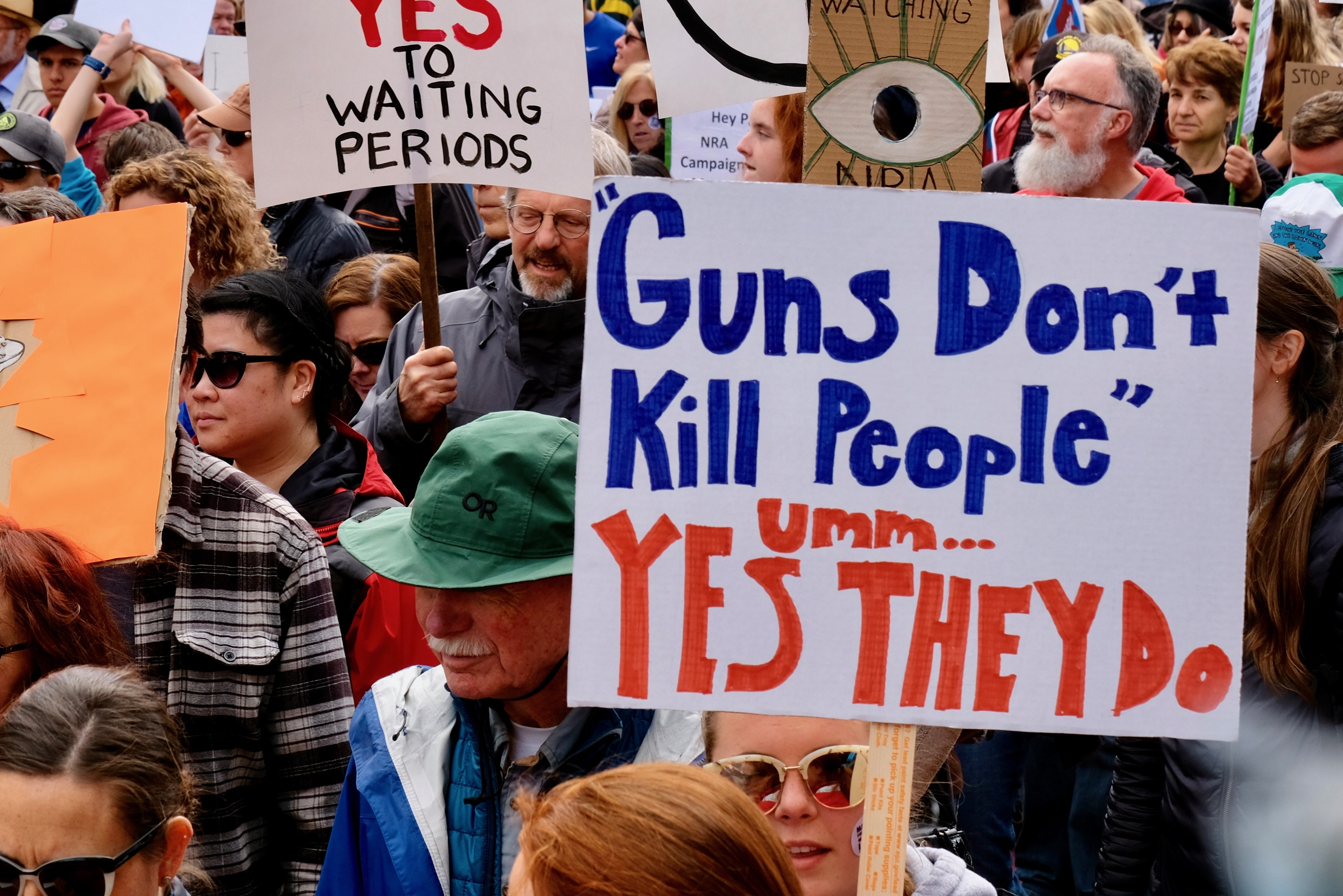
Counter slogan

"Guns don't kill people, people kill people" (and variations such as "guns don't kill people, people do" and "guns don't kill, people do") is a slogan popularized by the National Rifle Association of America (NRA) and other gun advocates. The slogan and connected understanding dates back to at least the 1910s, and it became widely popular among gun advocates in the second half of the 20th century, so much so that some have labeled it a cliché. The statement, its variants, and counter-variants have been positively or negatively referenced and paraphrased by both sides of the gun control debate, including NRA representatives, the President of the United States, lawmakers, and members of the general public. Proponents of gun control believe the slogan is an example of bumper sticker logic and supports the larger folk psychology behind gun advocacy.

In colloquial use, both parts of the statement are largely considered true. However, when the statement is used in the context of gun debates it can become a tactic of misdirection and might therefore be considered a red herring fallacy. The statement does not say anything about gun control (only further referencing that human beings have the tendency to be violent) but says nothing of gun ownership and gun violence. Furthermore, the statement presents two polarizing extremes (namely that either the guns or the people are entirely to blame)—however, neither advocates nor opponents of gun rights generally subscribe to an extreme, but tend to lie somewhere between them.

American, Canadian, Dutch, French, and Israeli philosophers, criminologists, psychiatrists, lawyers, and others have considered the statement. In the context of proximate and ultimate causation, the statement may be used as a case of "mistaken relevance of proximate causation" (overemphasis on the immediate causes of gun violence at the expense of deeper, more systemic issues). The statement has been considered in the context of technological neutrality, technological determinism, value neutrality, and the instrumentalist philosophy of technology. When arguing that guns have moral value and technological agency, the responsibility of the human is also considered. The gun-human relation becomes a key factor in analysis. Law in the United States already has parallels, for example in the case of regulations for automatic firearms.

There are numerous variations that extend the slogan to mental health and social issues, including some that convey that guns make it easier for people to kill, and others in which 'people' is substituted with criminals, toddlers, children, bullets, or other nouns. For the purpose of analyzing the slogan and explaining different points of view, experts replace 'guns' with other terms, such as cars, knives, butter knives, nuclear weapons, and weapons systems.

== History and usage ==
In modern times, the National Rifle Association (NRA) was involved in gun control politics as early as the period when the 1911 Sullivan gun control legislation was passed in New York. It was during this time that the slogan came into usage as a reason against gun control. American investigative journalist Jack Anderson has called the statement the organization's "first article of faith". Its usage on bumper stickers dates back to at least the 1970s. Along with other slogans and themes such as "if guns are outlawed only outlaws will have guns" and "America doesn't have a gun problem, it has a crime problem", it has been a part of pro-gun public relation campaigns. It is one of the main slogans of the NRA, and a favorite. Early research by scholars like Marvin Wolfgang in 1958 helped support the slogan. His weapon substitution hypothesis would have significant impact until the early 1990s. The opposing view is guns also kill people or people who kill use guns.

In 1968, during the introduction of the National Gun Crime Prevention Act bill, a frequently-asked-questions list was framed. The twenty-third question in that list was, "What about the argument that 'guns don't commit crimes, people do?' The answer provided accepted that people with guns commit crimes and included statistics for gun-related robberies and assaults. The statistics also included the number of Americans killed in the past five years through gun violence, and specifically referenced the assassinations of John Kennedy, Martin Luther King, and Robert Kennedy. In 1971 with regard to handgun control and the argument Congressman Abner Mikva said that guns not only make it easier to kill resulting in more murders, but guns also make it more practical and inviting to kill.

Following the 1987 Hungerford massacre in England, NRA made a statement that no legislation could protect from mental instability, and the slogan "guns don't kill people, people kill people," was also used. In 1997 Charlton Heston as president of the NRA said on Meet the Press, "There are no good guns. There are no bad guns. Any gun in the hands of a bad man is a bad thing." Two years later he would be quoted saying "this is not about guns, this is about maladjusted kids". The statement has an impact on the larger gun debate and its general message can be heard in response to shootings, even in the United States Congress. In 1999, following the Columbine High School massacre, representatives in the House of Representatives paraphrased their own versions of the slogan into their floor debate statements.

And no firearm has ever killed anyone unless directed by a person who acted either from malice, madness or idiocy. Sadly, not all of our elected officials are willing to accept this as fact. Somehow, guns themselves—pieces of hardware, no more, no less—have become the source of evil, while the actions of depraved individuals are conveniently ignored.

— Tom Clancy, in the Foreword of Guns, Crime, and Freedom (1994) by Wayne LaPierre

President Bill Clinton has referenced and addressed the statement a number of times. In 1995 at Georgetown University he said, "... The NRA's position on gun violence, the Brady Bill, and the assault weapons ban. Their position is: Guns don't kill people, people do. Find the people who do wrong, throw them in jail ... Do not infringe upon my right to keep and bear arms, even to keep and bear arsenals or artillery or assault weapons. Do not do that because I have not done anything wrong, and I have no intention of doing anything wrong ...".

The statement has been used in Congress on numerous occasions; four days after the Sandy Hook Elementary School shooting in 2012, Representative Gerry Connolly said the cliched phrase still impacts public debate. The following year Representative Rosa DeLauro shared a letter from a ninth grade student who quoted the slogan and compared Sandy Hook to the Chenpeng Village Primary School stabbing alluding to the lethality of guns. On the fifth anniversary of the shooting representative Sheila Jackson Lee used the slogan in her statements. American politician Mike Thompson, as a gun owner, used the slogan to justify background checks. Usage of the slogan by NRA has been called as an attempt to stifle debate. As a counter to the slogan guns have been called as an "enabler". It has been accepted that while the slogan may be true, it is people with guns who kill. In August 2019, President Donald Trump, in an address following two shootings at El Paso and Dayton used a variation of the slogan involving mental health, "mental illness and hatred pulls the trigger, not the gun." This was a clarification for a previous statement "It's not the gun that pulls the trigger, it's the people."

== Analysis ==
=== Slogan, argument ===
The statement is closer to being a slogan (Note: Words used with the statement include cliché, idiom, homily, maxim, aphorism, tautology, truism, mantra, adage, didactic, platitude, and propaganda.) than an argument; however, it is often used as an argument. While the statement is often used amidst gun violence and ensuing debates for gun control, it does not actually say anything about either violence or regulations. Nor does it say anything about gun advocates and corresponding narratives such as the feelings of safety, control, resistance or passion that guns provide. The statement does not have any apparent conclusion.

=== Causation, false dilemma ===
David Kyle Johnson, a professor of philosophy, considers the statement in the context of proximate and ultimate causation. Johnson concludes that the argument results in a "mistaken relevance of proximate causation". The statement, while laying focus on the fact that people are the "ultimate cause" of the killing, does not say anything about the proximate cause, for example whether gun control should follow. The focus on what should happen to the guns becomes secondary.

American philosopher Joseph C. Pitt explains that the slogan presents a false dilemma (or false dichotomy, an either/or choice that is a type of informal fallacy) as it tries to force a choice between what does the killing, guns or people, when in fact there is no reason to suppose that the answer is either/or. While it is true that guns cannot result in fatalities by themselves, that people do the killing and not guns, it is also true that people rarely kill using only their body. American philosopher Michael W. Austin, also concluding the slogan presents a false dilemma, explains that the slogan aims to convey that since people are flawed, it isn't a gun issue. Austin explains that existing law in the United States such as the National Firearms Act, which regulates automatic weapons, already consider the situation as a combined human-gun issue.

In a paper on the history of gun laws in Nazi Germany (which he argues were actually more permissive than those of the preceding Weimar Republic) law professor Bernard Harcourt, then based at the University of Chicago, says that the argument applies with equal force to the gun laws it is frequently voiced in opposition to, particularly with reference to Nazi gun laws, falsely alleged to have been introduced by Adolf Hitler with a laudatory reference to the country having enacted the world's first laws mandating firearm registration:

After all, the NRA stands for the proposition that "it's not guns that kill people, it's people who kill people." The central idea here is that instrumentalities—in this case handguns—are just that: instrumentalities. They are not to be blamed for what people do wrongly with them. If you follow the logic of that argument, then you would expect a member of the NRA to respond in the same manner when confronted with the Nazi-gun-registration argument: "It's not gun registration that produces gun confiscation and genocide, it's people who do."

=== Guns don't kill, technological neutrality ===
The statement and connected reasoning convey a proposition that guns are tools, inanimate, amoral, and neutral. Guns are not punished for killing people. Gun advocates understand that since the weapon does not do the killing it does not matter which weapon is used. The caliber does not matter, the type of bullet does not matter, nor does the type of magazine matter since "guns don't kill people". This reasoning leads to the view that all weapons do not kill by themselves and the weapon does not matter. In a 2018 study, American criminologists and professors Anthony Braga and Philip J. Cook find that caliber does matter when it comes to gun-related fatalities, that is to say that certain features of guns do matter when it comes to killings.

Gun control advocate Dennis A. Henigan says that the slogan, while a fallacy, is both "true" and "irrelevant"; true if the statement aims to convey that guns cannot do any harm all by themselves, and irrelevant since other consumer items are regulated irrespective.

This also becomes a debate between technological neutrality and technological determinism, and consideration of the gun as a value-neutral tool or technological artifact. American philosopher Andrew Feenberg, in a 2003 lecture to undergraduates, points out that technology as value-neutral falls under instrumentalist philosophy of technology and that this line of reasoning by instrumentalists cannot be agreed with. Here, Feenberg presents instrumentalism as one of four philosophies of technology, the others being determinism, substantivism, and critical theory; he places himself under critical theory. Philosopher Evan Selinger also holds this view of instrumentalism. The question of determinism raises the question of free will.

==== Guns do kill ====
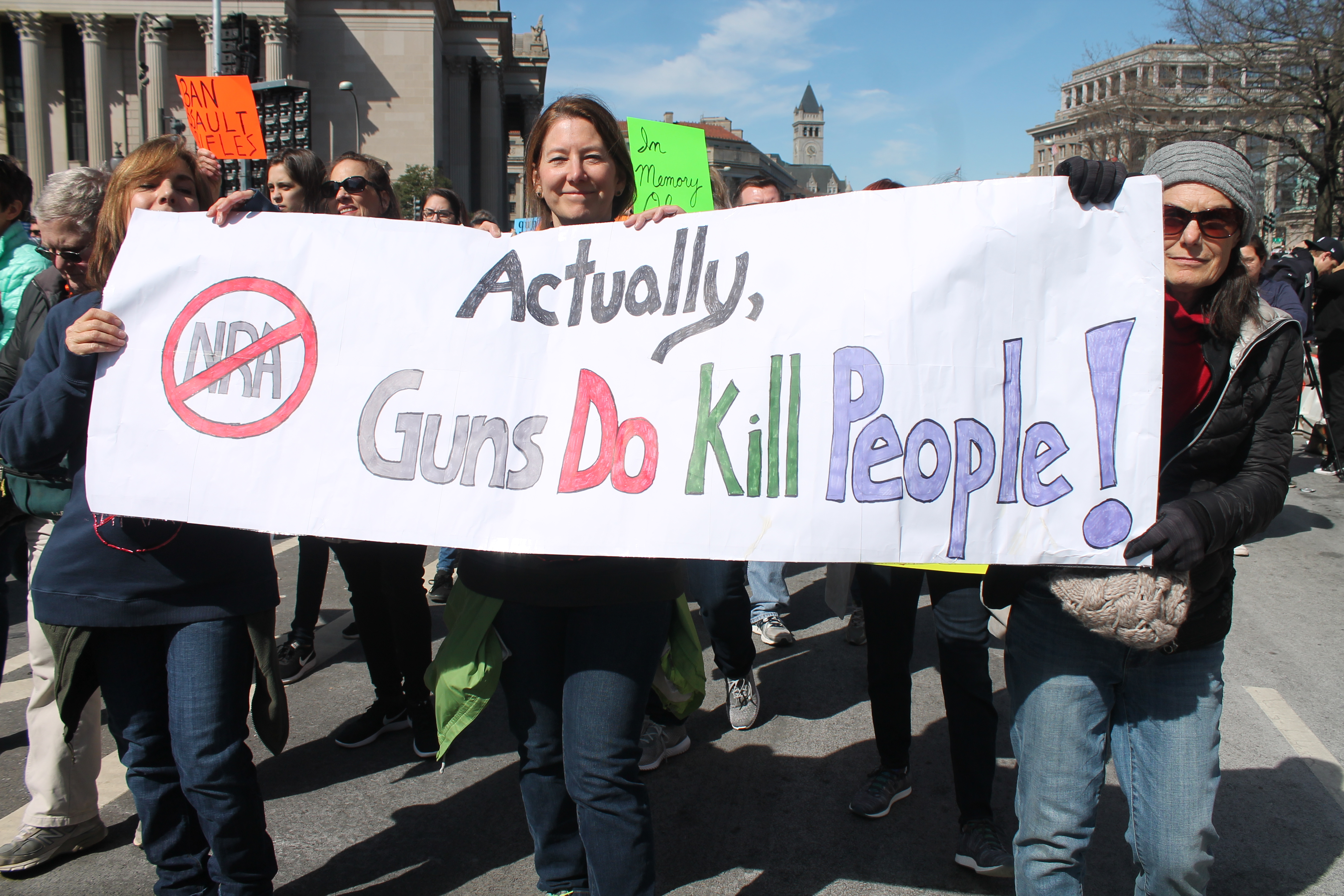
At a demonstration in support of gun control legislation, 2018

The opposing view is simplified as "guns do kill people". It is argued that guns have moral agency and technological agency, while the person pulls the trigger, the gun provides the technology to launch the bullet. When stating that guns have a moral role, this does not change the responsibility of the human. The argument that guns have moral value leads to a gun having political value. Since guns are responsible for some of the harm, they should also be regulated. This political value of guns can also be observed in the gun culture in the United States.

=== People kill people, individualism ===
The statement "people kill people" brings up the issue of human violence in general, not just gun violence, and not gun regulation. It is people who kill people, intent matters, and someone who is determined to kill will kill using any method. For this reason, the laws framed should address people and people with guns as opposed to laws that apply just to guns. In other words, the power rests solely with the people. This is a case of humanistic determinism.

American politician Jim Ross Lightfoot writes in an Longview News-Journal op-ed that the gun cannot be blamed for a shooting, "The gun is not at fault; blame for misuse lies with the person holding the firearm" and for this reason, people must be targeted to control gun violence, "Train young people to respect firearms and use them properly... Will the shootings go away? After a time, yes. Once the young people learn to respect others and themselves, the guns will stay in the drawer and no longer jump out to shoot someone." Following shootings in 2022 representative Jody Hice stated, "Guns are not the issue... we have a people-violence problem, who misuse guns...".

=== Gun-human relation, non-neutral ===
American philosopher Don Ihde explains that the slogan is a simplification and misses out on the human-gun relation, how gun ownership and gun possession affects the individual and eventually their gun use. Bruno Latour, a French philosopher, gave an analysis of the slogan in 1994 emphasizing that the transformative nature of the gun-human relation mattered as compared to just analyzing guns and people separately. Peter-Paul Verbeek, a Dutch philosopher, argues on the same line that responsibility of a kill rests with both gun and person. However, Israeli academic and philosopher Boaz Miller contests and extends both Pitt's and Verbeek's stance, that technology manufacturers and creators are also responsible for the use of their products.

Other non-neutral views include the weapons effect, and Franklin Zimring's, Gary Kleck's, and Richard Felson's scholarship; the first of Melvin Kranzberg's six laws of technology is "technology is neither good nor bad; nor is it neutral". Dennis A. Henigan, a former vice-president of the Brady Center to Prevent Gun Violence has stated that while the slogan is "one of the greatest advocacy slogans ever conceived", it is a fallacy since it does not address the "enabling" effect guns provide.

Canadian criminologist Thomas Gabor points to the "superficial truth" that guns cannot kill without a human; superficial since guns do have a part in the creation of violence. The gun increases the lethality of people who kill, increasing the chance of mass killings. Marketing and advertising for guns similarly point to the gun's power, its deterrent power, and that the gun is irreplaceable when it comes to self-defense. The human factor also encompasses people who are part of research and development to manufacturing to the marketing logistics chain. The money spent by lobbyists is another truth backing the lethality of guns. However, the view of gun advocates changes when it comes to crime, suicide, or accidents, the gun now becomes replaceable. The "stopping power" of guns does not make guns the most "effective tool" against violence.

=== Connected narratives ===
Connected narratives include ease of violence, the intended purpose, death by suicide, accidental deaths, a ban on lawn darts, and firearm deaths in other developed countries among others. The slogan is compared to similar ones such as "cars don't kill people, people who drive them do" and "knives don't kill people, people who carry them do". There are numerous laws and regulations for both cars and knives. This similar logic raises the question as to whether guns are more like cars or knives. The logic has been extended to nuclear bombs and fighter aircraft as well. Geopolitically the slogan can be extended to weapons systems and since "guns don't kill", since "weapon systems don't kill", we are left with a people situation, a political conclusion. Since weapons don't kill, nuclear disarmament makes no sense.

American philosopher Hugh LaFollette says the slogan is "uncontroversial" and "irrelevant" since guns don't have moral agency and gun control advocates do not contest this. However, "all objects are not created equal"; LaFollette gives a hypothetical parallel example of a pro-nuclear weapons advocacy organization advocating that "tactical nuclear weapons don't kill people, people do." Since guns are not nuclear weapons, nor are they "butter knives", LaFollette says that we then need to understand where the gun being referenced is placed between the extremes. This is similar to most of the views of people debating gun-related topics; most people do not limit their choice to being absolutely against or for the topic, rather they lie somewhere in between.

American physician and professor Stephen Hargarten and other researchers have provided a biopsychosocial disease approach to this statement about gun violence resulting in the conclusion that it is "scientifically inaccurate". Analyzing gun use according to scientific models such as the "disease model" allows for greater accuracy in the identification of areas for intervention such as the bullet, the kinetic energy, the impact of the projectile on the body, the physical changes made to the body as a result, and the health issues behind the pull of a trigger among other things.

While the slogan can be considered as bumper sticker logic, it impacts the public in the gun debate. The slogan backs up the folk psychology behind gun advocacy. It is a cliché; following the Robb Elementary School shooting Daniel E. Flores stated, "Don't tell me that guns aren't the problem, people are. I'm sick of hearing it."

== Variations ==
Counter variations

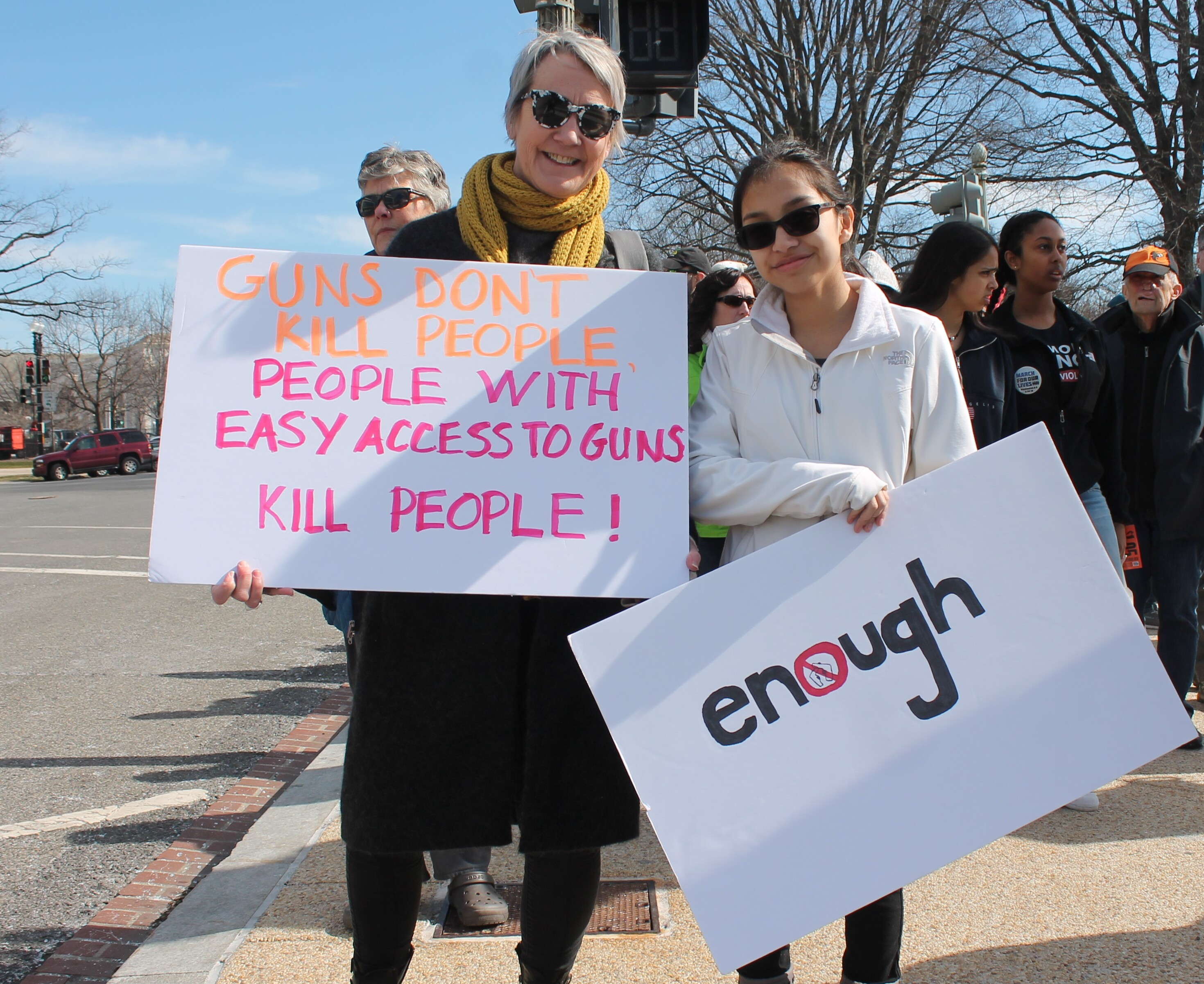
"Guns don't kill people, people with easy access to guns kill people."

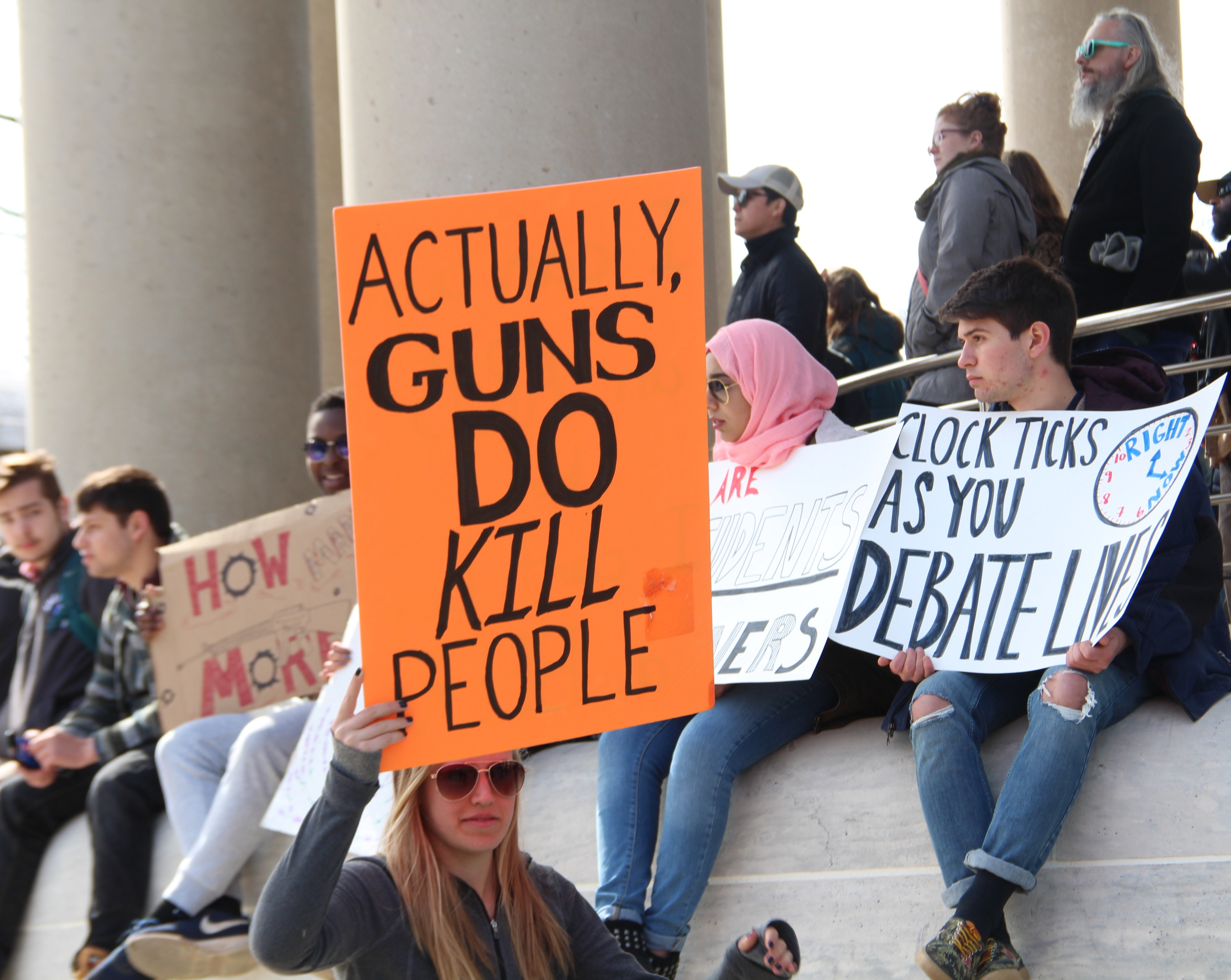
"Actually, guns do kill people"

A number of variations of the original slogan has been seen in popular culture.

One variation of the slogan pertains to the mental health of those using guns "guns don't kill people, crazy people kill people". American right-wing political commentator Ann Coulter frames it as "Guns don't kill people, the mentally ill do." In a counter to this, Metzl and MacLeish (2015) conclude that gun violence happens when guns and humans come together, a social context that cannot be addressed simply through a mental health approach. Charlton Heston, a NRA president, has been quoted in The Oxford Dictionary of Modern Quotations saying "It's not the guns that kill, it's the maladjusted kids."

The base slogan, when combined with a Handgun Control Inc slogan, (Note: Another counter slogan by Handgun Control Inc is "guns don't die, people do".) "working to keep handguns out of the wrong hands", results in an adapted NRA slogan "guns don't kill, bad people do". A variation of this is "guns don't kill people, criminals do"; this version is preferred by the gun lobby over the truer base slogan. Joseph C. Pitt (2014) gives another variation "guns don't kill, people kill using guns, knives, their hands, garrotes, automobiles, fighter planes, poison, voodoo dolls, etc". "Guns don't kill people, men and boys kill people" highlights the fact that nearly all gun-related violence is committed by males. Bumper stickers have seen a number of variations such as "guns don't kill people, drivers with cell phones do". Another variation "3D printers don't kill people—guns do" aims to address the concept of a 3D printed gun and the regulation of the technology behind gun creation.

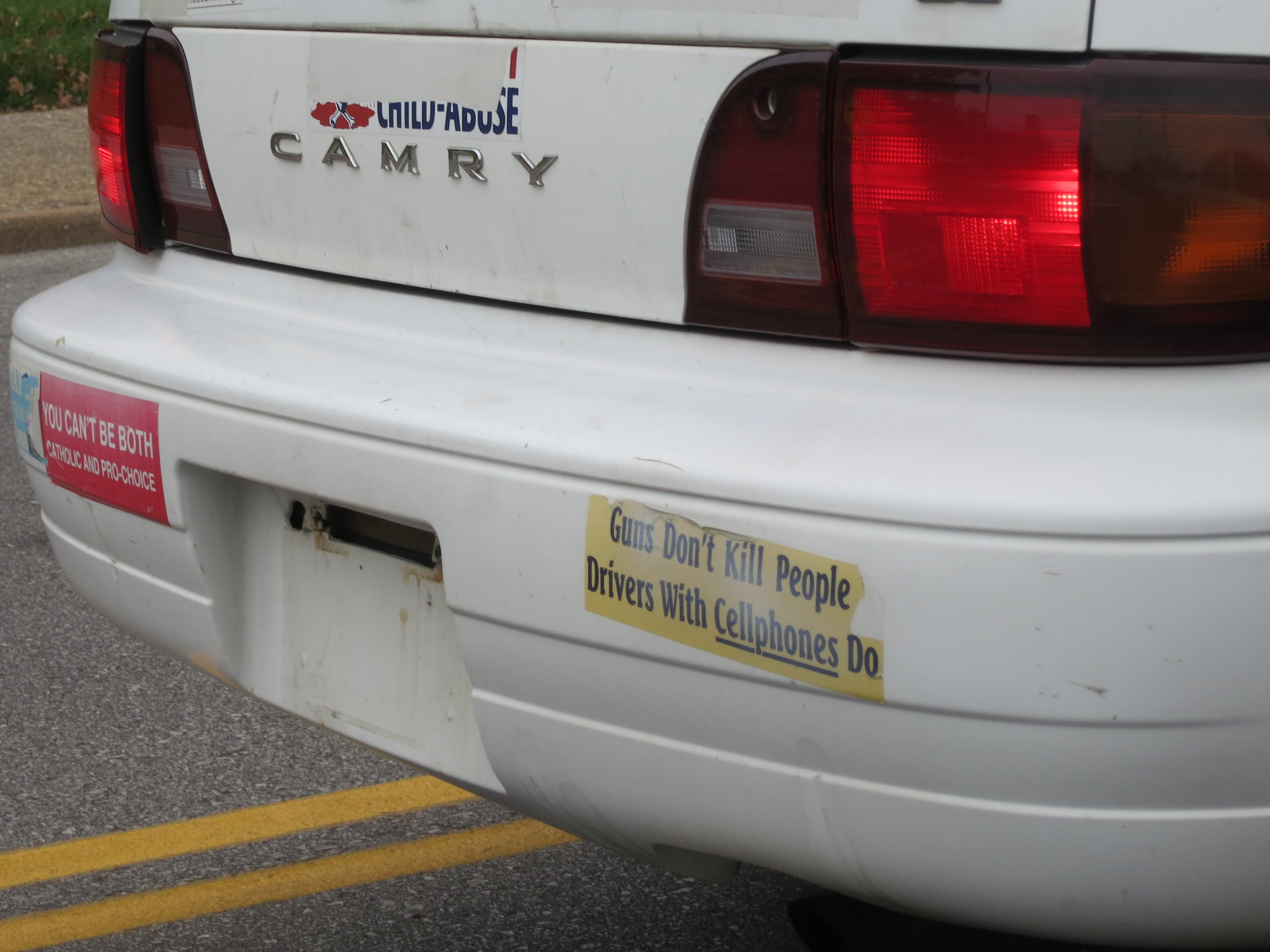
Bumper sticker

On analysis of the original slogan, gun violence researchers Philip J. Cook and Jens Ludwig provide alternatives "Guns don't kill people; they just make it real easy" and "guns don't kill people; violent and impulsive people kill people—usually with guns". On 5 December 1980 Michael J. Halberstam, an American doctor, was shot by a burglar. Just a few days before that, on 21 November, he said "It may be true that guns don't kill and people do, but handguns make it a lot easier. Too easy." Variations of this include "guns don't kill people, people kill people, but they sure make killing 'loved' ones easier" and "people kill people, but access to guns makes killing too easy". Dennis A. Henigan provides an alternate "guns don't kill people, they enable people to kill people". David Ropeik writes that "guns don't kill people, they certainly do make killing easier;" however, they also provide a sense of safety to gun owners, among other things.

In 1993, following the Long Island Rail Road shooting, Senator Daniel Patrick Moynihan stated that "guns don't kill people, bullets do" amidst proposing bans on select ammunition, taxes on others, and increased scrutiny in general. Moynihan reasoned that even if there was a blanket ban on guns in the United States, there were already enough in homes to last for at least two centuries; this was not the case with bullets whose stock could last only a few years and hence addressing bullets was a need. A longer variation is "guns don't kill people, people don't kill people, bullets kill people". Ellis Paul, in his song Autobiography of a Pistol, uses this phrase.

Michael Moore, a filmmaker, has given his version of the slogan, "guns don't kill people, Americans kill people". This is based on statistics of relative gun ownership and corresponding gun violence in countries such as Canada, Japan and other rich countries. A common comparison is made to Switzerland and its high level of gun ownership but low level of gun violence. Leading from this is an adapted conclusion "Guns don't kill people – a complex mix of national characteristics and historical factors eventually coming to a boil does".

"Guns don't kill people, toddlers kill people" was the message of a satirical public service announcement by the Brady Campaign, which went on to suggesting that toddlers were the ones who needed to be put behind bars. This is a reference to the number of accidental deaths caused by toddlers with guns. A similar quote was used in the 1990 movie Funny About Love by Gene Wilder "guns don't kill people, children kill children". Ana Marie Cox and Michael Moorcock (in a review of Iain Overton's book) independently analyze this statement and the statistics that back it up.

Other variations

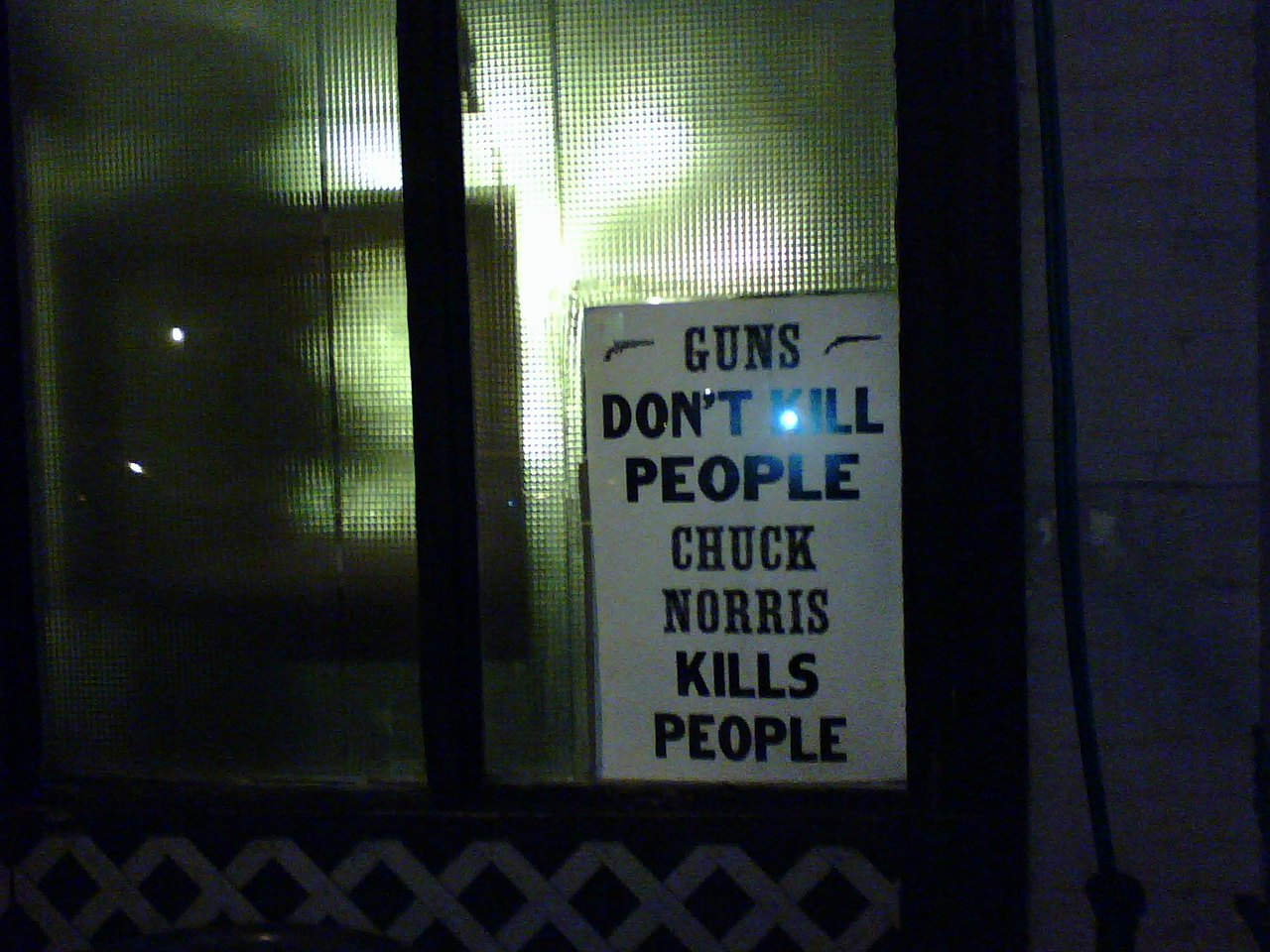
Window sign

- "Guns don't shoot people, people shoot people"
- "People without guns injure people; guns kill them"
- "People with guns kill people"
- "Guns, even machine guns, don't kill, people do"
- "People kill people... guns kills people"
- "Guns don't kill people, I do"
- "Guns don't kill people, lack of gun control kills people"
- "Guns don't kill people, liberal gun control laws kill people"
- "Guns don't kill people, gun control laws kill people"
- "Guns don't kill people, liberalism does"
- "Guns don't kill people, evil people kill people"

== See also ==
- From my cold, dead hands
- "Guns Don't Kill People, Rappers Do"
- "Guns Don't Kill People... Lazers Do"
