= Assault Weapons Ban of 2013 =

Defeated bill

- Long title: To regulate assault weapons, to ensure that the right to keep and bear arms is not unlimited, and for other purposes.
- Acronyms (colloquial): AWB 2013
- Announced in: the 113th United States Congress
- Sponsored by: Sen. Dianne Feinstein (D, CA)
- Number of co-sponsors: 20

Codification
- Acts affected: Atomic Energy Act of 1954; Higher Education Act of 1965; Omnibus Crime Control and Safe Streets Act of 1968
- U.S.C. sections affected: 18 U.S.C. § 922, 18 U.S.C. § 921, 18 U.S.C. § 924, 20 U.S.C. § 1070 et seq. 18 U.S.C. § 925A, and others.
- Agencies affected: United States Department of Justice; United States Congress

Legislative history
- Introduced in the Senate as S. 150 by Dianne Feinstein (D–CA) on January 24, 2013; Committee consideration by United States Senate Committee on the Judiciary

The Assault Weapons Ban of 2013 (AWB 2013) was a bill introduced in the 113th United States Congress as S. 150 by Senator Dianne Feinstein, D–CA, on January 24, 2013, one month after the Sandy Hook Elementary School shooting. It was defeated in the Senate on April 17, 2013 by a vote of 40 to 60.

== Background ==
Efforts to create a new federal Assault Weapons Ban (AWB 1994) were renewed on December 14, 2012, when 20 children and six adults were shot and killed at Sandy Hook Elementary School in Newtown, Connecticut. At the time, it was the deadliest shooting to occur at a primary or secondary school, the second-deadliest mass shooting by a single person, and one of the 25 deadliest mass shootings in U.S. history.

Within hours of the shooting, a We the People user started a petition asking the White House to "immediately address the issue of gun control through the introduction of legislation in Congress." That afternoon, President Barack Obama made a televised statement offering condolences on behalf of the nation to Connecticut governor, Dannel Malloy and saying, "we're going to have to come together and take meaningful action to prevent more tragedies like this, regardless of the politics." Speaking at a December 16 memorial service in Newtown, Obama said he would "use whatever power this office holds" to prevent similar tragedies. By December 17, the White House petition had more than 150,000 signatures, and one week after the shooting it had almost 200,000, along with those on 30 similar petitions.

On December 21, 2012, Wayne LaPierre, executive vice president of the National Rifle Association of America (NRA), expressed the gun-rights group's sympathy for the families of Newtown. He said, "The only thing that stops a bad guy with a gun is a good guy with a gun," and that debating legislation that won't work would be a waste of time.

Feinstein and Senator Richard Blumenthal, D-CT, held a separate news conference in response to LaPierre's. There, Feinstein said that the bill was a work in progress and that one idea was to register grandfathered assault weapons under the National Firearms Act (NFA) and another was a buy-back program. A December 26, two-page bill summary on the senator's web site also mentioned registering grandfathered assault weapons under the NFA, but not a buy-back program. (Neither proposal appeared in the text of the bill introduced to the Senate.)

On January 16, 2013, Obama announced a plan for reducing gun violence in four parts, one of which was banning assault weapons and high-capacity magazines. The plan included 23 executive orders, signed immediately by the president, and 12 proposals for Congress, including reinstating and strengthening the ban on assault weapons that was in place from 1994 to 2004, and limiting ammunition magazines to 10 rounds.

The proposals were opposed by the NRA and the National Shooting Sports Foundation (NSSF), and opposition was expected by legislators of both parties.

== Introduction of the bill, and debate ==
On January 24, 2013, Dianne Feinstein and 24 Democratic cosponsors introduced S. 150, the Assault Weapons Ban of 2013, into the U.S. Senate. The bill was similar to the 1994 federal ban, but differed in that it used a one-feature test for a firearm to qualify as an assault weapon rather than the two-feature test of the 1994 ban. Such a move would deter the average gun owner from wanting to purchase a neutered rifle. In addition, it banned: the sale, transfer, importation or manufacture of about 150 named firearms; firearms with thumbhole stocks and bullet buttons; the importation of assault weapons and large-capacity magazines; and high-capacity ammunition magazines (defined as those capable of holding more than 10 rounds). It would grandfather in weapons legally owned on the day of enactment and exempt more than 2,000 specific firearms "used for hunting or sporting purposes."

On March 14, 2013, the Senate Judiciary Committee approved the bill, though it was expected not to clear the full Senate. (Had the bill passed in the Senate, it was not expected to pass in the House of Representatives.)

=== Advocacy ===
The NRA's reaction to the proposed bill was swift. Its Institute for Legislative Action division started a "Stop The Gun Ban" campaign before the legislation was introduced in the Senate, asking its members to call their representatives and urge them to oppose the ban. Gun Owners of America (GOA) asked its members to do the same. The Brady Campaign to Prevent Gun Violence issued a press release in support of the bill.

=== Public opinion ===
A USA Today/Gallup poll conducted days after the shooting showed that public support for strengthening gun laws rose 15 percent compared to a similar poll in 2011. A law banning assault weapons was opposed by 51 percent of Americans, but one banning high-capacity magazines (defined by the poll as those capable of holding more than 10 rounds) was supported by 62 percent of Americans.

== Defeat of the bill and aftermath ==
In March 2013, Senate Majority Leader Harry Reid decided to leave the proposed ban out of the broader gun control bill, saying that it was unlikely to win 40 votes in the 100-member chamber and that it would jeopardize more widely supported proposals. On the morning of April 17, 2013, Feinstein displayed on the Senate floor a blow-up of a New York Daily News front page with photos of the 20 dead Sandy Hook Elementary School children and the headline, "Shame on U.S." Before the vote, she said to her colleagues, "Show some guts." However, as expected, S. 150, the Assault Weapons Ban of 2013, failed on a vote of 40 in favor to 60 in opposition. It was supported by Democrat Reid and Republican Senator Mark Kirk, but 15 Democrats, one independent, and all the Republicans except Kirk voted against the ban.

After the vote, Feinstein said that Congress' failure to pass the law would lead a number of states passing their own assault weapons bans. She vowed to keep trying, and said "I believe the American people are far ahead of their elected officials on this issue."

== Criticism of the bill ==
In an anonymously written 2013 handbill, the NSSF (a firearm-industry trade association) said there were over 100 million "high-capacity magazines" (as defined by the bill) already in circulation in the United States. They also said that very few of these magazines were registered and a ban like this would be ineffective in keeping these magazines out of criminal hands.
