= The Machine Question =

2012 nonfiction book by David J. Gunkel

- Cover for The Machine Question: Critical Perspectives on AI, Robots, and Ethics
- Author: David J. Gunkel
- Genre: Non-fiction, philosophy, computer science, ethics
- Publisher: MIT Press
- Publication date: July 13, 2012
- Media type: Print (Hardcover & paperback)
- Pages: 270
- ISBN: 0262017431

The Machine Question: Critical Perspectives on AI, Robots, and Ethics is a 2012 nonfiction book by David J. Gunkel that discusses the evolution of the theory of human ethical responsibilities toward non-human things and to what extent intelligent, autonomous machines can be considered to have legitimate moral responsibilities and what legitimate claims to moral consideration they can hold. The book was awarded as the 2012 Best Single Authored Book by the Communication Ethics Division of the National Communication Association.

== Content ==
The book is spread across three chapters, with the first two chapters focusing on an overall review of the history of philosophy and its discussion of moral agency, moral rights, human rights, and animal rights and the third chapter focusing on what defines "thingness" and why machines have been excluded from moral and ethical consideration due to a misuse of the patient/agent binary.

The first chapter, titled Moral Agency, breaks down the history of said agency based on what it included and excluded in various parts of history. Gunkel also raises the conflict between discussing the morality of humans toward objects and the theory of the philosophy of technology that "technology is merely a tool: a means to an end". The main issue, he explains, in defining what constitutes an appropriate moral agent is that there will be things left outside of what is included, as the definition is based on a set of characteristics that will inherently not be all-encompassing. The subject of consciousness is broached and subsequently derided by Gunkel because of it being one of the main arguments against machine rights, while Gunkel points out that no "settled definition" of the term exists and that he considers it no better than a synonym used for "the occultish soul". In addition, the issue of the other minds problem entails that no proper understanding of consciousness can come to pass due to the inability to properly understand the mind of a being that is not oneself.

The second chapter, titled Moral Patiency, focuses on the patient end of the topic and discusses the expansion of the fields of animal studies and environmental studies. Gunkel describes moral patients as the ones that are to be the object of moral consideration and deserve such consideration even if they lack their own agency, such as animals, thus allowing moral consideration itself to be broader and more inclusive. The topic of other minds is discussed again when examining the question of whether animals can suffer, a question that Gunkel ultimately abandons because it encounters the same problems that the topic of consciousness does. Especially because the subject of animal rights is often only afforded for the animals deemed to be "cute", but often not including "reptiles, insects, or microbes". Gunkel continues on to examine environmental ethics and information ethics, but finds them to be too anthropocentric, just as all the other examined models have been.

The third chapter, titled Thinking Otherwise, proposes a combination of Heideggerian ontology and Levinasian ethics to properly discuss the otherness of technology and machines, but finds that the patient/agent binary is unable to be properly extended to confine the extent of "the machine question". In discussing the land ethic philosophy espoused by Aldo Leopold, Gunkel proposes that it is the entire relationship between agent and patient that should have moral consideration and not a specific definition based on either side, as each part contributes to the relationship as a whole and cannot be removed without breaking that relationship.

== Critical reception ==
Choice: Current Reviews for Academic Libraries writer R. S. Stansbury explained that the book is able to use simple examples to discuss difficult topics and separate ideas and that it would be "useful for philosophy students, and for engineering students interested in exploring the ethical implications of their work". Dominika Dzwonkowska, writing for International Philosophical Quarterly, stated that the "unprecedented value of the book is that Gunkel not only analyzes important aspects of the immediate problem but also that he places his discussion in the context of philosophical discussions on such related issues as rights discourse." Mark Coeckelbergh in Ethics and Information Technology noted that focusing on the question itself of the machine question allows further exploration of machine ethics and the expansion of general ethics and that the book's questions point out that "good, critical philosophical reflection on machines is not only about how we should cope with machines, but also about how we (should) think and what role technology plays (and should play) in this thinking."

A review in Notre Dame Philosophical Reviews by Colin Allen criticized some of Gunkel's methodology and the indecisiveness of his ultimate answer to the machine question, but also acknowledged that the book "succeeded in connecting the ethics of robots and AI to a much broader ethical discussion than has been represented in the literature on machine ethics to date". Blay Whitby, in a review for AISB Quarterly, lauded The Machine Question for its "clear exposition" and wide range of references to other works, concluding that the book is "essential reading for philosophers interested in AI, robot ethics, or animal ethics". In a twin review of The Machine Question and Robot Ethics: The Ethical and Social Implications of Robots by Patrick Lin, Keith Abney, and George A. Bekey, Techné: Research in Philosophy and Technology reviewer Jeff Shaw called Gunkel's book a good introduction to the "complex field of robot ethics" and that both books are "highly recommended to both the general reader as well as to experts in the field of robotics, philosophy, and ethics."

In a 2017 paper for Ethics and Information Technology, Katharyn Hogan investigated whether the machine question presented by Gunkel in the book is any different from the longstanding animal question. She concludes that the real question that is revealed from this discussion is whether humans deserve any moral preference over artificial life in the first place.
