= Techne (disambiguation) =

Techne is a term derived from Greek that is often translated as "craftsmanship", "craft", or "art".

Techne may also refer to:

- Bio-Techne Corporation, a biotechnology company whose former name was Techne Corporation
- Techné: Research in Philosophy and Technology, a journal (established 1995)
- Techne Ltd., an industrial equipment company that operated in the UK from 1948 to 2005
