= Society for Philosophy and Technology =

The Society for Philosophy and Technology (SPT) is an independent international organization founded in 1976 whose purpose is to promote philosophical consideration of technology. SPT publishes Techné: Research in Philosophy and Technology, an academic journal.

== History ==
- 1975: Newsletter launched: formation of SPT and establishing the journal Techné in years to follow
- 1978: Annual Book Series Research in Philosophy of Technology was launched
- 1981: Actual organization of SPT with the first biennial international meeting organized by Fritz Rapp in Bad Homberg, Germany
- 1995: The first issue of Techné
- 2010: Techné is published by the Philosophy Documentation Center

== Presidents ==
A new president for the Society for Philosophy and Technology is chosen every two years (except in 1995).

- 1981: Carl Mitcham
- 1983: Alex Michalos
- 1985: Kristin Shrader-Frechette
- 1987: Marx Wartofsky
- 1989: Langdon Winner
- 1991: Joseph C. Pitt
- 1993: Jose Sanmartin
- 1997: Paul Durbin
- 1999: Deborah Johnson
- 2001: Andrew Light
- 2003: Paul Thompson
- 2005: Peter Kroes
- 2007: Diane Michelfelder
- 2009: Philip Brey
- 2011: Sven Ove Hansson
- 2013: Peter-Paul Verbeek
- 2015: Shannon Vallor
- 2017: Mark Coeckelbergh
- 2019: Pieter E. Vermaas
- 2021: Inmaculada de Melo-Martín
- 2023: Robert Rosenberger
- 2025: Alfred Nordmann

== SPT conferences ==
- 1981: Bad Homberg, Germany: Joint German-American Conference (Rapp), Germany, Organizer: Fritz Rapp
- 1983: Polytechnic Institute of New York, NYC, USA, Organizer: Carl Mitcham
- 1985: University of Twente, Netherlands, Organizer: Louk Fleishacker of Free University, Amsterdam
- 1987: Virginia Tech, Blacksburg, VA, Organizer: Joe Pitt
- 1989: Bordeaux, France, Organizer: Daniel Cerezuelle
- 1991: University of Puerto Rico, Mayaguez, Puerto Rico, Organizer: Elena Lugo
- 1993: Peniscola (Valencia), Spain, Organizer: Jose Sanmartin
- 1995: Hofstra University, Long Island, New York, USA
- 1996: Puebla, Mexico, Organizer: Raul Gutierrez
- 1997: University of Düsseldorf, Germany, Organizer: Alois Huning
- 1999: University of California, San Jose / Silicon Valley, USA, Organizer: Noam Cook
- 2001: Aberdeen, Scotland, Organizer: Andrew Light
- 2003: Park City, Utah, USA, Organizer: Diane Michelfelder
- 2005: Delft University of Technology, Delft, The Netherlands, Organizer: Peter Kroes
- 2007: USC/VT, Charleston, South Carolina, USA, Organizers: Davis Baird, Ann Johnson, Joe Pitt
- 2009: University of Twente, Enschede, The Netherlands, Organizers: Philip Brey, Tsjalling Swierstra, Peter-Paul Verbeek, Katinka Waelbers
- 2011: University of North Texas, Denton, Texas, USA, Organizers: David Kaplan and Adam Briggle
- 2013: in Lisbon, Portugal
- 2015: NEU International Hotel, Shenyang, China
- 2017: Technische Universität Darmstadt, Germany, Organizers: Alfred Nordmann and Sabine Ammon
- 2019: Texas A&M University, College Station, Texas, USA, Organizers: Martin Peterson (Chair), Deb Banerjee, Jonathan Coopersmith, Glen Miller, Gregory Pappas, Linda Radzik
- 2021: Université Catholique de Lille, Lille, France, Organizers: David Doat, Richard Lewis, Xavier Guchet
- 2023: Tokyo, Japan
- 2025: Eindhoven, Netherlands

== Pre-SPT events ==
- 1965: symposium at 8th annual SHOT (with AAAS) meeting in San Francisco
- 1973: international conference on history and philosophy of technology, University of Illinois
- 1975: University of Delaware (Paul T. Durbin): first meeting of philosophers interested in technology, organized with much help from Carl Mitcham
- 1977: 2d UD meeting, at which they talked about a society and established a newsletter (with Durbin as first editor), as well as set in motion meetings jointly with APA sections, and an election some time before the end of 1980. (First candidates were Carl Mitcham, who won, and Mario Bunge.)
- 1978: First APA Eastern meeting. Also first volume in RESEARCH IN PHILOSOPHY AND TECHNOLOGY (Johnson) series.
