= Guns Don't Kill People =

Guns Don't Kill People may refer to:

- Guns Don't Kill People... Lazers Do, debut album by American band Major Lazer
- "Guns Don't Kill People Rappers Do", song by Welsh rap group Goldie Lookin Chain
- "Guns don't kill, people do" and its variations, is a slogan popularized by the National Rifle Association of America
