= Good guy with a gun =

Phrase in gun-rights debate

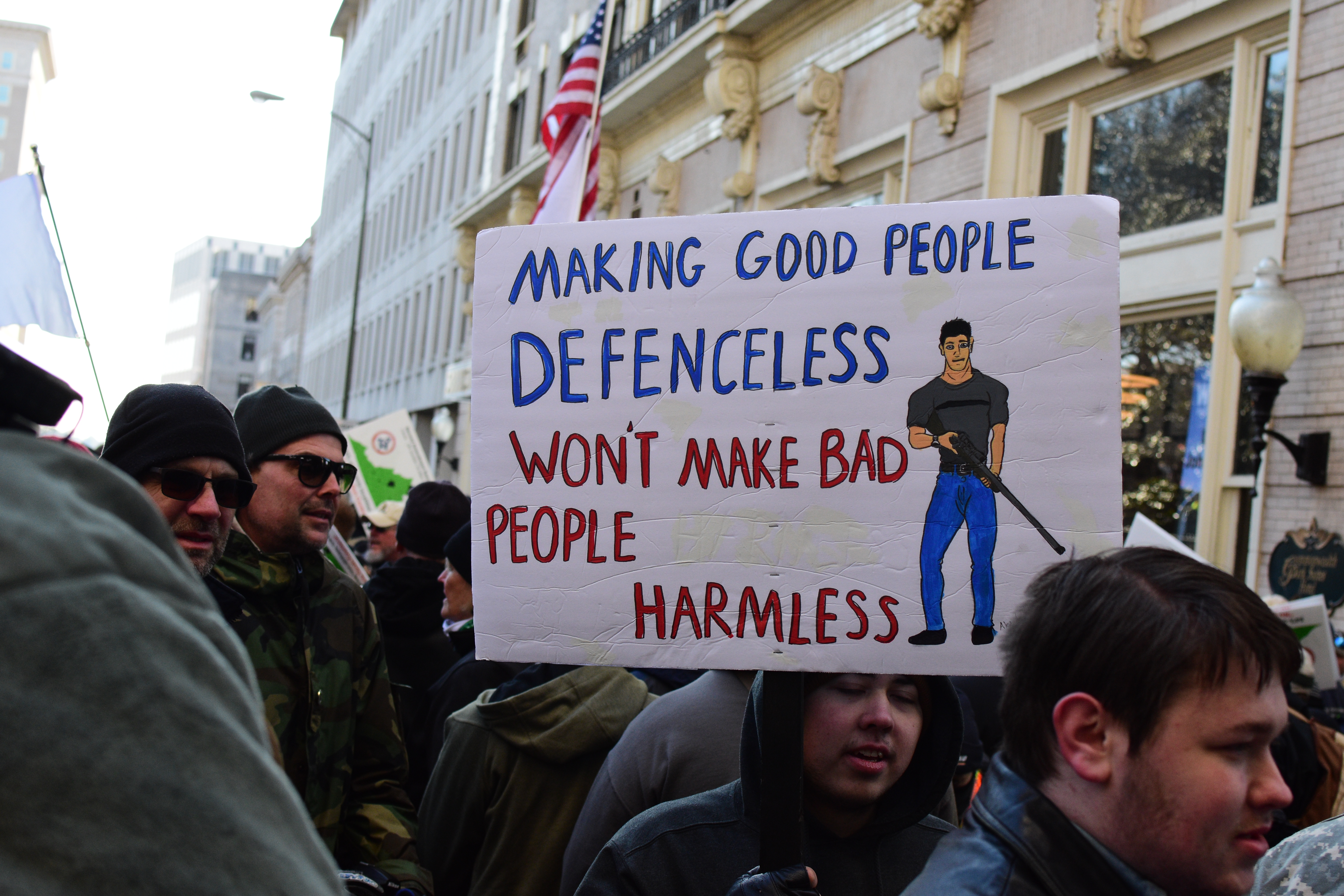
A protester at the 2020 VCDL Lobby Day rally, with a variation of the phrase

A good guy with a gun, in American gun control debate, refers to the idea that the best way to prevent or end a mass shooting is with high accessibility of weapons to civilians and police willing to stop an attack. The phrase originates with Wayne LaPierre in 2012, who stated that "the only way to stop a bad guy with a gun is with a good guy with a gun."

== History and usage ==
On December 21, 2012, Wayne LaPierre, one week after the Sandy Hook Elementary School shooting, in a press conference announcing the NRA's National School Shield Emergency Response Program, stated that "the only way to stop a bad guy with a gun is with a good guy with a gun." This is considered to be the first mainstream usage of the phrase.

At the 2022 NRA Convention, soon after the Robb Elementary School shooting, Ted Cruz stated a variation of the phrase, saying that "what stops armed bad guys is armed good guys."

== Analysis ==
A New York Times study reported how outcomes of active shooter attacks varied with actions of the attacker, the police (42% of total incidents), and bystanders (including a "good guy with a gun" outcome in 5.1% of total incidents).

A 2013 study by Texas State University criminologists analyzed 160 active shooter incidents, finding only one in three to have been prevented by lethal force from police or civilians. None of the incidents involving school shootings in the study were ended by armed guards or armed staff. Instead, the shooter was often restrained by unarmed staff. However, a plurality of active shooter incidents are resolved by the attacker fleeing or committing suicide. The presence of armed guards does little to deter school shooters, with Santa Fe High School, Stoneman Douglas High School, Great Mills High School, and Marshall County High School being prominent examples of school shootings against schools with armed guards. A 2020 study found "no association between having an armed officer and deterrence of violence" and that an "armed officer on the scene was the number one factor associated with increased casualties."

== Notable incidents ==
- On August 1, 1966, in the University of Texas tower shooting at the University of Texas at Austin in Austin, Texas, 25-year-old Charles Whitman fatally shot 15 people and injured 31 others. Most of the victims were shot by Whitman from the Main Building's observation deck. Multiple civilians fired back from the ground at Whitman during the attack to suppress him. Three police officers, and 40-year-old civilian Allen Crum, who was given a rifle by a police officer, confronted Whitman at the top of the tower, and two of the police officers fatally shot Whitman.
- On February 24, 2005, 43-year-old David Hernandez Arroyo Sr. ambushed his ex-wife and their son with an AK-47 outside the Smith County Courthouse in Tyler, Texas, killing his wife and wounding his son. After shooting his wife and son, nearby law enforcement officers engaged in a shootout with Arroyo. Arroyo wounded two police officers during the gunfight. During the shootout, Arroyo was confronted by 52-year-old Mark Alan Wilson, who shot Arroyo multiple times from behind, but struck Arroyo in his bulletproof vest. Arroyo then fatally shot Wilson, before eventually fleeing and engaging in a high-speed chase with police, during which he was shot and killed by police officers.
- On September 24, 2017, at the Burnette Chapel Church of Christ in the Antioch neighborhood of Nashville, Tennessee, 25-year-old Emanuel Samson opened fire with two pistols, killing a woman and injuring six others. Samson was confronted by 22-year-old Robert Engle, who Samson pistol-whipped. However, as the two men struggled with each other, Samson accidentally shot himself in the chest. Engle then retrieved a pistol from his car and pointed it at Samson until police arrived.
- On November 5, 2017, 26-year-old Devin Patrick Kelley opened fire with a rifle and two pistols at First Baptist Church in the area of Sutherland Springs, Texas, killing 25 people (one who was a pregnant woman) and injuring 22 others. 55-year-old Stephen Willeford ambushed Kelley with a rifle from behind a truck as Kelley exited the church, striking him multiple times and piercing his body armor at least once. Kelley then drove away after shooting back at Willeford with a handgun, and with the help of a passing driver who picked up Willeford, 27-year-old Johnnie Langendorff, they engaged in a high-speed chase with Kelley until the gunman lost control and crashed.
- In the Greenwood Park Mall shooting in Greenwood, Indiana, on July 17, 2022, 20-year-old Jonathan Douglas Sapirman opened fire inside the mall after assembling a rifle in a bathroom, killing three people and injuring two others. Sapirman was then fatally shot by 22-year-old Elisjsha Dicken from approximately 40 yards (37 m) away. Dicken was legally armed, but the mall prohibited people from carrying weapons on its property. However, the mall praised Dicken's actions and did not mention its policy of no-weapons.
- In the Silver Rail Elementary School shooting in Bend, Oregon, on October 15, 2026, 36-year-old Kaylub Giamanco pursued and killed 16-year-old Griffin J. John II after witnessing him entering the school with a gun. John fatally shot three students and a teacher, and wounded two others, before Giamanco killed him. He was credited with saving several lives by officials, including Bend police chief Mike Krantz, Oregon governor Tina Kotek, and President Donald Trump.

== Popular culture ==
- Good Guy with a Gun is a 2022 coming-of-age film by John Mossman on gun culture set in rural Illinois.
- A Good Guy is a 2024 play by David Rambo exploring arming teachers.
- Good Guy with a Gun! is a 2026 satirical musical by Philip Labes and Micah O'Konis.

== See also ==
- Arming teachers
- Concealed carry
- Gun violence
- Guns don't kill people, people kill people
- Right to keep and bear arms
