= The International Encyclopedia of Ethics =

- First edition
- Author: Hugh LaFollette (editor)
- Language: English
- Subject: Moral philosophy
- Publisher: John Wiley & Sons
- Publication date: 2013, 2018 (2nd ed.)
- Media type: Print, online
- ISBN: 9781405186414

The International Encyclopedia of Ethics is an 11-volume encyclopedia of ethics edited by Hugh LaFollette. The encyclopedia was given Honorable Mention in competition for the Best Reference Work of 2013 by the Research User Services Association.

== Reception ==
The book has been reviewed by John Martin Fischer, Jennifer A. Herdt, Peter Singer and Larry S. Temkin.
