= Alison Adam =

British sociologist

- Citizenship: British
- Scientific career
- Fields: feminist technoscience, computer ethics, critical information systems, online privacy, history of forensic science
- Institutions: Lancaster University University of Manchester Institute of Science and Technology University of Salford (2000–2012) Sheffield Hallam University (2012–present)

Alison Adam is a British researcher in the field of Science and Technology Studies and is known for her work on gender in information systems and the history of forensic science. She is professor emerita of science, technology and society at Sheffield Hallam University, Sheffield, UK.

== Career ==
Adam was a research fellow at Lancaster University, and a lecturer and senior lecturer in the Department of Computation at the University of Manchester Institute of Science and Technology. She was professor of information systems from 2003 to 2008, then professor of science, technology and society from 2008 to 2012 at the University of Salford, where she worked from 2000 until 2012, heading the Information Systems Institute in 2004–06 and then directing the Information Systems, Organisations and Society Research Centre. She has been professor of science, technology and society at Sheffield Hallam University, Sheffield since 2012.

== Research interests ==
Adam's research has primarily been within the area of Science and Technology Studies, including history and sociology of science and technology. Her predominant focus was the field of information systems. Her main contribution to research in gender and technology was a study of gender in relation to artificial intelligence (AI), in particular how feminist epistemology could be used to challenge the epistemology of AI and a study of feminist ethics and how it relates to computer ethics. Publications in this area include the Artificial Knowing: Gender and the Thinking Machine and Gender, Ethics and Information Technology. The book Gender, Ethics and Information Technology explores the "intersection of two areas; firstly gender and information and communication technologies and secondly, computer ethics." In 2012 she completed a three-year Engineering and Physical Sciences Research Council funded research project on online privacy, in collaboration with researchers at Salford, Royal Holloway, University of London, and Cranfield University. She has evaluated the part that gender plays in ethics in on-line behaviour evaluating the gender divide in hacking, cyberstalking, and pornography to evaluate what gender differences exist in on-line experiences.

Since 2010 Adam has researched the history and sociology of forensic sciences. Her 2015 book, A History of Forensic Science: British Beginnings in the Twentieth Century, charts the history of forensic sciences in the UK, mainly England, considering the broad spectrum of factors that went into creating the discipline in Britain in the first part of the twentieth century.

Textiles are another long-standing interest. She states that "there's nothing quite like making a physical artifact. The culture of sharing information about making, on-line, is fascinating." From 2012 to 2014, she was engaged in interdisciplinary research on the culture of mending clothes.

== Teaching and administration ==
At the University of Salford, Adam taught cybercrime, digital divide, research methodology, and sociology of forensic sciences. Adam served as deputy chair of the Research Excellence Framework (REF) 2014 sub-panel on Communication, Cultural and Media Studies, Library and Information Management (UoA 36) and was a member of the Research Assessment Exercise (RAE) 2008 sub-panel on Library and Information Management (UoA 37).

== Selected publications ==
Books

- A History of Forensic Science: British Beginnings in the Twentieth Century, Routledge; 2015
- Gender, Ethics and Information Technology, Palgrave Macmillan; 2005
- Artificial Knowing: Gender and the Thinking Machine, Routledge; 1998; 2006
