= Marvin Wolfgang =

American sociologist and criminologist (1924–1998)

- Born: November 14, 1924; Millersburg, Pennsylvania, U.S.
- Died: April 12, 1998 (aged 73); Philadelphia, Pennsylvania, U.S.
- Known for: Weapon substitution hypothesis

Academic background
- Education: University of Pennsylvania
- Academic advisor: Thorsten Sellin

Academic work
- Discipline: Sociologist
- Sub-discipline: Criminologist
- Institutions: University of Pennsylvania

Marvin Eugene Wolfgang (14 November 1924 – 12 April 1998) was an American sociologist and criminologist.

== Biography ==
Wolfgang was a soldier in World War II and participated in the Battle of Monte Cassino. After the war he studied at Dickinson College, graduating in 1948, and the University of Pennsylvania, where his principal teacher was Thorsten Sellin. At Penn, Wolfgang took his MA (1950) and PhD (1955) in sociology/criminology. Until his death in 1998 he was a professor of criminology at the University of Pennsylvania.

In 1964, he published The Measurement of Delinquency, which was the first study of the true impact of crime on society. Three years later, he completed The Subculture of Violence: Towards an Integrated Theory in Criminology, which focused on high rates of violence among blacks and the influence of a black subculture.

Wolfgang wrote over 30 books and 150 articles throughout his life. His most famous work, Delinquency in a Birth Cohort, was published in 1972. This book marked the beginning of large-scale studies of crime and delinquency. It was a study of over 10,000 boys born in Philadelphia in 1945. The purpose was "to determine which members of the cohort had official contacts with the police, to compare delinquents with nondelinquents, and to trace the volume, frequency and character of delinquent careers up to age 18." The data revealed that of 9,945 boys, 3,475 had at least one recorded police incident. Other statistics showed that offender rates increased gradually from ages 7 to 11, increased rapidly from 11 to 16, and declined at age 17. The study concluded that a small number of offenders account for most of the offenses committed. It also stated that "the juvenile justice system has been able to screen the hard core offenders fairly well, but it has been unable to restrain, discourage, or cure delinquency."

Wolfgang won many awards, including the Hans Von Hentig Award from the World Society of Victimology in 1988, the Edwin Sutherland Award from the American Society of Criminology in 1989, the Beccaria Gold Medal from the German, Austrian, and Swiss Society of Criminology in 1997. He was a member of both the American Philosophical Society and the American Academy of Arts and Sciences. In 1993, the Wolfgang Criminology Award was established in his name.

Wolfgang spent the later years of his life showing his opposition to issues such as the death penalty and the use of a gun against a perpetrator in articles such as "We Do Not Deserve to Kill" and A Tribute to a View I Have Opposed. in which he says he does not like Gertz's and Kleck's conclusions that having a gun for self-defense "can be useful" but cannot fault their methodology. However, he also cites research showing that resistance to robbery increases the likelihood of injury, while also reducing the chance of a successful robbery. Therefore, he states he remains a gun control advocate, stating if he could, he "would eliminate all guns from the civilian population and maybe even from the police."

His career was cut short by pancreatic cancer, and he died on 12 April 1998, while in the middle of a longitudinal study of crime in China. He is survived by his wife, his two daughters, and his two grandsons. The British Journal of Criminology stated he was "the most influential criminologist in the English-speaking world."

== Weapon substitution hypothesis ==
Wolfgang's 1958 weapon substitution hypothesis was based on a comparison of homicide rates and corresponding homicides in which firearms were present. While Pennsylvania and the state's largest city Philadelphia had a similar homicide rate for the years considered in the study, homicides in which firearms were the cause were nearly twice as more common in Pennsylvania. One of the conclusions Wolfgang argued was that even if firearms had been removed from a shooting, the assailant would have chosen the next most suitable weapon and carried on with their intentions. In other words, availability of firearms did not impact homicide rates since those who use a firearms are determined in their destructive ends, determined to kill, and will then kill using some other method.

Studies which provided a counter or alternate to Wolfgang's conclusions included Zimrings' observations that "if knives were substituted for guns, the homicide rate would drop significantly" (weapon instrumentality effect). While Zimrings' observations provided a new direction of research, they all suffered from the same problem of the subjective nature of an assailants intentions. This lack of methodological objectivity in measuring an assailants intentions resulted in Wolfgang's research having significant influence until the early 1990s. Wolfgang's undiscredited weapon substitution hypothesis would have an impact on the gun debate as it was able to counter the best of pro-gun control conclusions. It would have lesser of an effect in the 1990s due to the growing research on the weapon instrumentality effect. Even Wolfgang would go on to publish data that contradicted his weapons substitution hypothesis and would even disown it. While data suggests it to be untrue, it has not been conclusively confirmed.

== Major works ==
- Patterns in Criminal Homicide, Philadelphia Univ. of Pennsylvania 1958. OCLC 832916743
- The Subculture of Violence: Towards an Integrated Theory in Criminology, London : Tavistock Pubs., 1967. OCLC 222594669
- Marvin E Wolfgang; Robert M Figlio; Thorsten Sellin Delinquency in a Birth Cohort, Chicago : The University of Chicago Press, 1972. ISBN 9780226905532, OCLC 468433908
