= Joseph C. Pitt =

American philosopher (born 1943)

- Born: 1943 (age 82–83)
- Education: William & Mary
- Occupation: Philosopher
- Organization: Virginia Tech

Joseph C. Pitt (born 1943) is an American Pragmatist, philosopher of science and technology who works at Virginia Tech in the Departments of Philosophy and Science and Technology in Society. He is a past editor-in-chief of Techné: Research in Philosophy and Technology and the former editor of Perspectives on Science. He was founding director of the Center for Science Studies at Virginia Tech, which is now the Department of Science, Technology, and Society. He is a foundational figure in philosophy of technology and a past president of the Society for Philosophy and Technology.

Pitt did his undergraduate studies at William & Mary, where he was a member of a fraternity. He completed his graduate studies in Canada at Western Ontario.

Pitt is the author of:

- Pictures, Images and Conceptual Change; An Analysis of Wilfrid Sellars' Philosophy of Science (1981)
- Galileo, Human Knowledge, and The Book of Nature: Method Replaces Metaphysics (1992)
- Thinking About Technology (2000)
- Doing Philosophy of Technology (2011)
