= Greg Dawes =

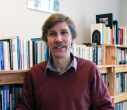
- Born: 1957 (age 68–69)
- Education: University of Northern Iowa (BA, MA), University of Washington (PhD)

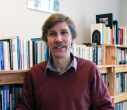
Prof. Greg Dawes at his office, North Carolina State University, January 29, 2013

Gregory Dawes (born 1957) is a distinguished professor of Latin American Studies at North Carolina State University. He has written on Latin American studies and literary theory and is the editor of A Contracorriente, an online academic journal dedicated to approaching social history and Latin American literature from a left-wing perspective, and managing editor of Editorial A Contracorriente, the Journal's publishing spin-off.

== Personal information and education ==
Dawes received his B.A. and M.A. in Spanish from the University of Northern Iowa. He received his Ph.D. in Romance Languages and Literature with a concentration in Latin American Literature from the University of Washington.

== Political beliefs ==
Dawes is a democratic socialist. His classes are on twentieth-century Latin American literature and culture and literary theory. He teaches courses on the culture of Chile during the Popular Unity government in Chile, the 60s in Latin America, the Latin American avant-garde, and on Latin American poetry. He has published articles and books on Latin American poetry, particularly on Pablo Neruda, Octavio Paz, Vicente Huidobro, César Vallejo, Ernesto Cardenal, Mario Benedetti, among others.

== Syllabi ==
- Critical Approaches to Literature and Culture
- Literature and Culture of Latin America III

== Selected books ==
His publications include:

- Aesthetics and Revolution: Nicaraguan Poetry, 1979-1990. Minneapolis: University of Minnesota Press, 1993. ISBN 0-8166-2146-2.
- Verses Against the Darkness: Pablo Neruda's Poetry and Politics. Lewisburg: Bucknell University Press, 2006. ISBN 0-8387-5643-3.
- Mario Benedetti, escritor uruguayo contemporáneo: estudios sobre su compromiso literario y político / Mario Benedetti, Contemporary Uruguayan Author: Studies on His Literary and Political Commitments. Lewiston: Edwin Mellen Press, 2008. ISBN 0-7734-5202-8.
- Poetas ante la modernidad: las ideas estéticas y políticas de Huidobro, Vallejo, Neruda y Paz. Madrid: Editorial Fundamentos, 2009. ISBN 84-245-1193-X.
- Multiforme y comprometido. Neruda después de 1956. Santiago de Chile: RIL Editores, 2015. ISBN 978-956-01-0147-1.
