= Stephen Hargarten =

American physician

Stephen W. Hargarten is an American emergency physician, gun violence researcher, and professor at the Medical College of Wisconsin in Milwaukee. At the Medical College of Wisconsin, he is also Chair of the Department of Emergency Medicine, Associate Dean for the Global Health Program, and director of the Injury Research Center.

== Education ==
Hargarten received his MD from the Medical College of Wisconsin and his MPH from the Johns Hopkins Bloomberg School of Public Health in 1984. He completed an internship at the Gorgas Hospital in Panama.

== Career ==
Hargarten joined the faculty of the Medical College of Wisconsin in 1989. In January 2010, he was named associate dean of the Office of Global Health at the Medical College of Wisconsin. In 2014, he became the director of the Center for International Health, which the Medical College of Wisconsin describes as "a collaborative of several institutions, including the University of Wisconsin-Milwaukee and Marquette University". He has treated hundreds of gunshot victims during his medical career.

== Research ==
Hargarten has been called "one of the nation's leading gun violence experts". In 2007, he and Bella Dinh-Zarr presented a study in Washington, D.C. as part of the Global Traffic Safety Week analyzing data on non-disease deaths of Americans overseas from 2004 to 2006.

== Gun violence activism ==
Hargarten campaigned against a bullet, proposed by the Black Talon brand in the 1990s, that unfolded into a petal-like pattern after entering a victim, arguing that it could promote the spread of infections when surgeons tried to remove it from a wound, however there are no documented reports of this actually happening. Also in the 1990s, he proposed three changes to reduce handgun deaths, which, according to the Milwaukee Journal Sentinel, were: "urging the use of trigger locks; an indicator to show that a gun is loaded; and a lock mechanism that allows only the owner to have use of the gun". His efforts opposing the bullet included writing an editorial on the subject in the Journal of Trauma and encouraging other physicians to campaign against it as well. He has said that armed civilians trying to stop mass shootings are more likely to exacerbate the situation than mitigate it, because they are less likely to hit their targets than police.

== Honors and awards ==
Hargarten was elected to both the National Academy of Medicine (then known as the Institute of Medicine) and the Johns Hopkins Society of Scholars in 2011.

== Work with academic societies ==
Hargarten is the founding president of the Society for Advancement of Violence and Injury Research, and a past president of the Association of Academic Chairs of Emergency Medicine. He also serves on the Violence and Injury Prevention Mentoring Committee of the World Health Organization and on the board of directors of the Association for Safe International Road Travel.
