= Hugh LaFollette =

American philosopher

Philosophical work
- Era: 21st-century philosophy
- Region: Western philosophy
- Institutions: University of South Florida St. Petersburg
- Main interests: moral philosophy
- Website: www.hughlafollette.com

Hugh LaFollette is an American philosopher who holds the Marie E. and Leslie Cole Emeritus Chair in Ethics (and Emeritus Professor of Philosophy) at the University of South Florida. He primarily works on moral philosophy.

He is author of four books and numerous philosophical essays; he also edited (or co-edited) six volumes; several have seen multiple editions. He is Editor-in-Chief of the International Encyclopedia of Ethics (Wiley)—currently in its 2nd print edition (11 volumes). The IEE is updated annually online.

He wrestles with an array of moral topics. More theoretical essays have addressed: egoism, relativism, moral status, justice, and liberty; his writings on practical ethics grapple with gun control, conscience, children, families and friends, animals, punishment, hunger, and the environment. He addresses practical topics theoretically. He contends practical and theoretical issues are interwoven: each informs, and is informed by, the other.

He strives to communicate vital ideas to a wider public—for eight years, as host of "Ideas and Issues" on WETS-FM; most recently, (May 2022) in an op-ed essay in The Tennessean.

== Books ==
- In Defense of Gun Control, Oxford University Press 2018
- The Practice of Ethics, Blackwell 2007
- Brute Science: Dilemmas of Animal Experimentation, with N. Shanks, Routledge 1997
- Personal Relationships: Love, Identity, and Morality, Blackwell 1996.
- Ethics in Practice: An Anthology, (Blackwell Philosophy Anthologies).
- The Blackwell Guide to Ethical Theory, (Blackwell Philosophy Guides).
- The Oxford Handbook of Practical Ethics, (Oxford Handbooks).
- The International Encyclopedia of Ethics
- World Hunger and Morality (with W. Aiken). Prentice-Hall, 1996.
- Person to Person (with G. Graham). Temple University Press, 1989
- Whose Child? (with W. Aiken). Rowman & Allenheld, 1980
- World Hunger and Moral Obligation (with W. Aiken). Prentice-Hall, 1977
