= Thomas Gabor =

Canadian criminologist

Thomas Gabor is a Canadian criminologist who was a professor of criminology at the University of Ottawa for thirty years. He received his Ph.D. from Ohio State University in 1983. As of January 2017, he lived in Palm Beach County, Florida.
