= Wayne LaPierre =

American gun rights lobbyist (born 1949)

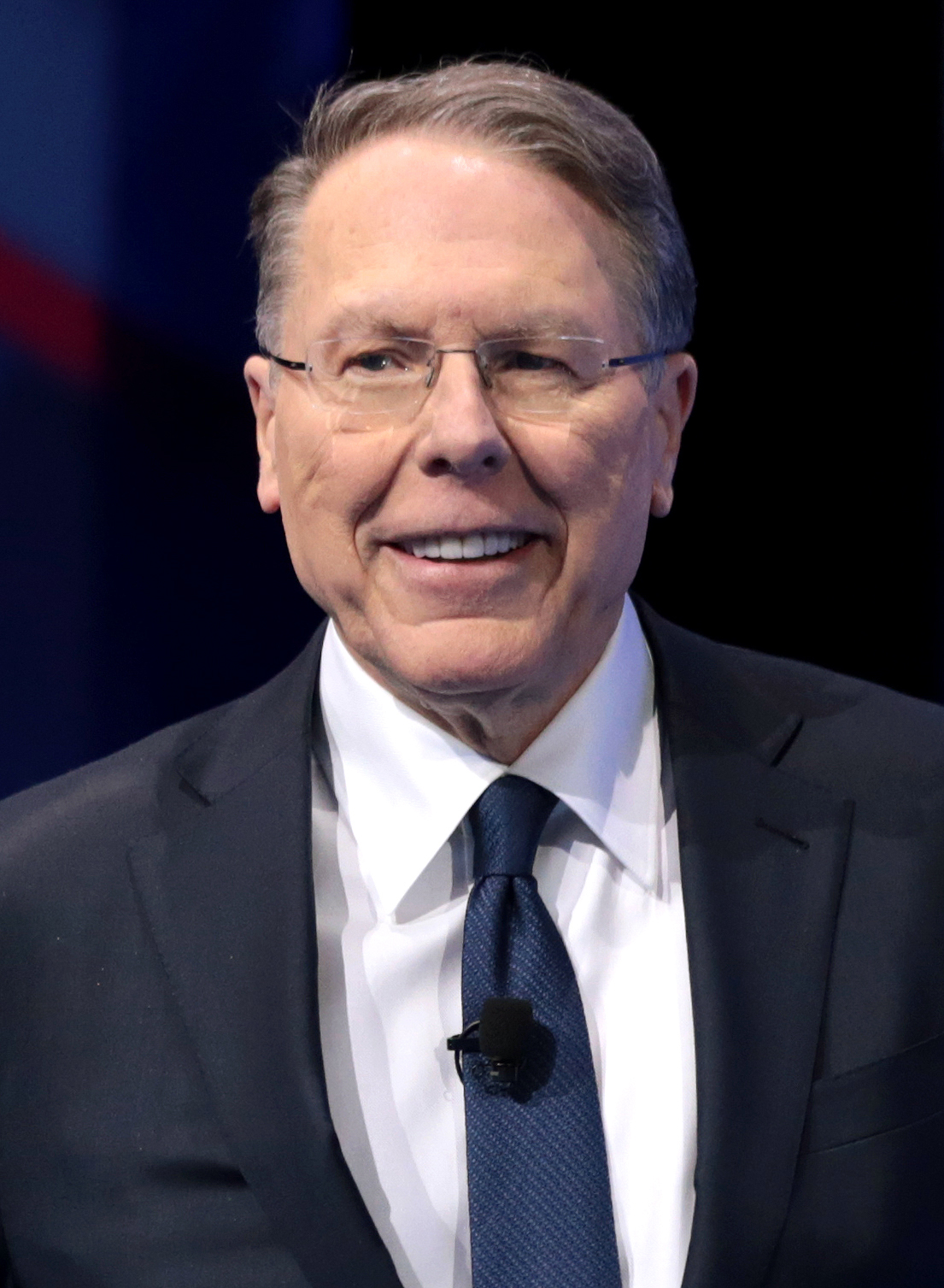
- LaPierre in 2017
- Born: Wayne Robert LaPierre Jr. November 8, 1949 (age 77); Schenectady, New York, U.S.
- Education: Siena College (BA); Boston College (MA)
- Occupations: Business executive; gun rights lobbyist
- Spouse: Susan Znidorka (m. 1998)

Wayne Robert LaPierre Jr. (born November 8, 1949) is an American gun rights lobbyist who was the CEO and executive vice president of the National Rifle Association of America (NRA), a position he held between 1991 and 2024.

LaPierre has faced scrutiny over his career for his controversial statements. In 1995, his criticism of federal agents after the Ruby Ridge and Waco incidents led to former President George H. W. Bush resigning his NRA membership. He criticized former President Bill Clinton’s approach to gun control measures and advocated for armed officers to be placed in schools after the Sandy Hook and Stoneman Douglas school shootings.

LaPierre has advocated for increased funding for mental health programs and stricter punishment for gun-related offenses. In addition, he supported restrictions on bump stocks after the 2017 Las Vegas mass shooting.

On January 5, 2024, the NRA posted on X that LaPierre would resign from his position on January 31. The announcement came days before his civil trial for corruption in New York.

== Early life ==
Wayne Robert LaPierre Jr. was born on November 8, 1949, in Schenectady, New York, the eldest child of Hazel (Gordon) and Wayne Robert LaPierre Sr. His father was an accountant for the local General Electric plant. His family moved to Roanoke, Virginia, when LaPierre Jr. was five years old, and he was raised Catholic. LaPierre first received a student deferment, then a medical deferment (the cause of which is still publicly unknown) and therefore was not drafted into military service during the Vietnam War.

== Personal life ==
After divorcing his first wife, LaPierre married Susan Znidorka in 1998.

== Career ==
Wayne LaPierre has been a government activist and lobbyist since receiving his master's degree in government and politics, including positions on the board of directors of the American Association of Political Consultants, the American Conservative Union, and the National Fish and Wildlife Foundation.

=== National Rifle Association activity ===
Since 1991, he served as EVP and chief executive of the NRA, the largest gun rights advocacy and firearms safety training/marksmanship organization in the United States. LaPierre joined the NRA in 1977 after working as a legislative aide to Democratic Virginia delegate and gun rights advocate Vic Thomas. LaPierre announced his forthcoming resignation from the NRA on January 5, 2024, to take effect January 31. In early 2024, Doug Hamelin was elected to replace LaPierre as Executive Vice President and chief executive officer.

In 2014, NRA contributions totaled $103 million and LaPierre's compensation was $985,885. In 2015, NRA contributions totaled $95 million. In that year, LaPierre received a $3.7 million deferred compensation distribution from his "employee funded deferred compensation plan", which was required by federal law, and according to the NRA raised his total annual compensation to $5,110,985.

=== Fraud and financial misconduct lawsuit ===
On August 6, 2020, following 18 months of investigation, New York Attorney General Letitia James filed a civil lawsuit against the NRA and LaPierre, as well as treasurer Wilson Phillips, former chief of staff and current executive director of general operations Joshua Powell and general counsel and secretary John Frazer, alleging fraud, financial misconduct, and misuse of charitable funds, and calling for the dissolution of the association due to chronic fraudulent management. The NRA attempted to have the case moved to Texas and the dissolution lawsuit dismissed, but federal Judge Harlin Hale of the Northern District of Texas ruled that the effort was made in bad faith. LaPierre's compensation and exorbitant corporate spending on personal items such as expensive suits, home landscaping and mosquito treatment, chartered jet flights, and a traveling "glam squad" for his wife, drew attention in the eleven-day hearing. In March 2022, New York Supreme Court Justice Joel Cohen denied the claim to dissolve the NRA, while allowing the lawsuit against LaPierre and the organization to move forward.

On February 23, 2024, a six-week-long civil trial concluded with the jury ordering LaPierre to repay the NRA $4,351,231 of the $5.4 million the jury found he had misspent. It also ordered the NRA's retired finance chief, Wilson Phillips, to repay $2 million, found that the NRA omitted or misrepresented information in its tax filings, and violated New York law by failing to adopt a whistleblower policy.

== Views on gun rights ==
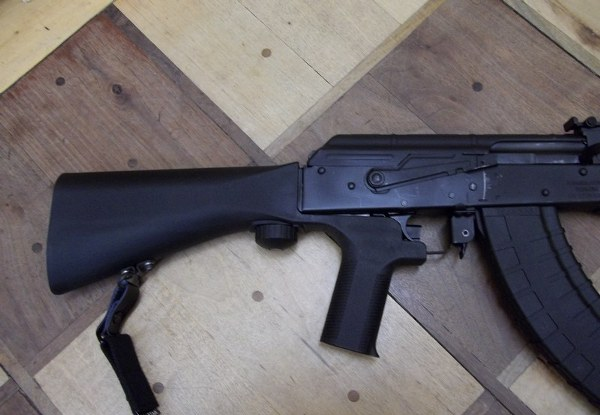
LaPierre supported regulation on bump stocks (pictured here on a WASR-10 rifle).

LaPierre has called for the presence of "armed, trained, qualified school security personnel" at schools. At a press conference in the wake of the December 14, 2012 Sandy Hook Elementary School shooting, LaPierre announced that Asa Hutchinson, former Arkansas congressman and DEA chief, would lead the NRA's National School Shield Emergency Response Program, saying "The only way to stop a bad guy with a gun is with a good guy with a gun."

LaPierre blamed the Sandy Hook incident, and others like it, on "lack of mental health reform and the prevalence of violent video games and movies".

LaPierre has stated his support for the following:

- Increasing funds for a stricter and more efficient mental health system, and reform of civil commitment laws to facilitate the institutionalization of the mentally ill when necessary.
- Creating a computerized universal mental health registry of those adjudicated to be legally incompetent, to help limit gun sales to the mentally ill.
- Increasing enforcement of federal laws against and incarceration of violent gang members or felons with guns.
- Project Exile and similar programs that mandate severe sentences for all gun crimes, especially illegal possession. LaPierre stated, "By prosecuting them, they prevent the drug dealer, the gang member, and the felon from committing the next crime... Leave the good people alone and lock up the bad people and dramatically cut crime."
- Restriction on "bump-fire"-type rifle stocks, in the aftermath of the 2017 Las Vegas mass shooting.
- Bans on fully automatic firearms.

== Criticism ==
In 1995 in the aftermath of the Waco and Ruby Ridge incidents, LaPierre wrote a fundraising letter describing federal agents as "jack-booted government thugs" who wear "Nazi bucket helmets and black storm trooper uniforms to attack law-abiding citizens." The term "jack-booted government thugs" had been coined by United States Representative John David Dingell Jr., Democrat of Michigan, in 1981, referring to ATF agents, and came to be frequently repeated by the NRA. Former president George H. W. Bush was so outraged by the letter that he resigned his NRA life membership. In response to growing criticism, LaPierre apologized, saying he did not intend to "paint all federal law-enforcement officials with the same broad brush".

In 2000, LaPierre said President Bill Clinton tolerated a certain amount of violence and killing to strengthen the case for gun control and to score points for his party. Clinton White House spokesman Joe Lockhart called it "really sick rhetoric, and it should be repudiated by anyone who hears it". In 2004, citing Democratic candidate John Kerry's history of authoring and supporting gun control legislation, LaPierre actively campaigned against the senator in the 2004 presidential elections.

In response to the Sandy Hook Elementary School shooting, he connected gun violence with "gun-free zones", violent films and video games, the media, weak databases on mental illness and lax security, and called for armed officers at American schools in an effort to protect children from gun violence. Following the event, several in the media criticized LaPierre's statements, including the Pittsburgh Post-Gazette editorial board and The Atlantic's Jeffrey Goldberg. Others also criticized the NRA's remarks, including Republican Party strategist and pollster Frank Luntz.

In response to the February 14, 2018 Stoneman Douglas High School shooting in Parkland, Florida, LaPierre delivered a speech on February 22 at the Conservative Political Action Conference (CPAC) held in National Harbor, Maryland, in which he criticized the FBI, the media and gun control advocates. "As usual, the opportunists wasted not one second to exploit tragedy for political gain. The elites do not care one whit about America's school system and schoolchildren. If they truly cared, what they would do is they would protect them. For them it is not a safety issue, it is a political issue ... [Gun control advocates] don't care if their laws work or not. They just want get more laws to get more control over people. But the NRA, the NRA does care." David Graham of The Atlantic questioned his reference to "elites," since LaPierre earns millions from his work. LaPierre also argued that the constitutional right to keep and bear arms "is not bestowed by man, but granted by God to all Americans as our American birthright."

On April 27, 2021, a video emerged of LaPierre shooting an African bush elephant at point-blank range on a 2013 hunting trip in Botswana, "demonstrating that the nation's foremost gun advocate could barely shoot." The video drew criticism from conservation groups.

Non-profit organization positions
Preceded by J. Warren Cassidy	Chief Executive Officer and Executive Vice President of the National Rifle Association of America; 1991–2024	Succeeded by Andrew Arulanandam (Interim)
