= David J. Gunkel =

American writer (born 1962)

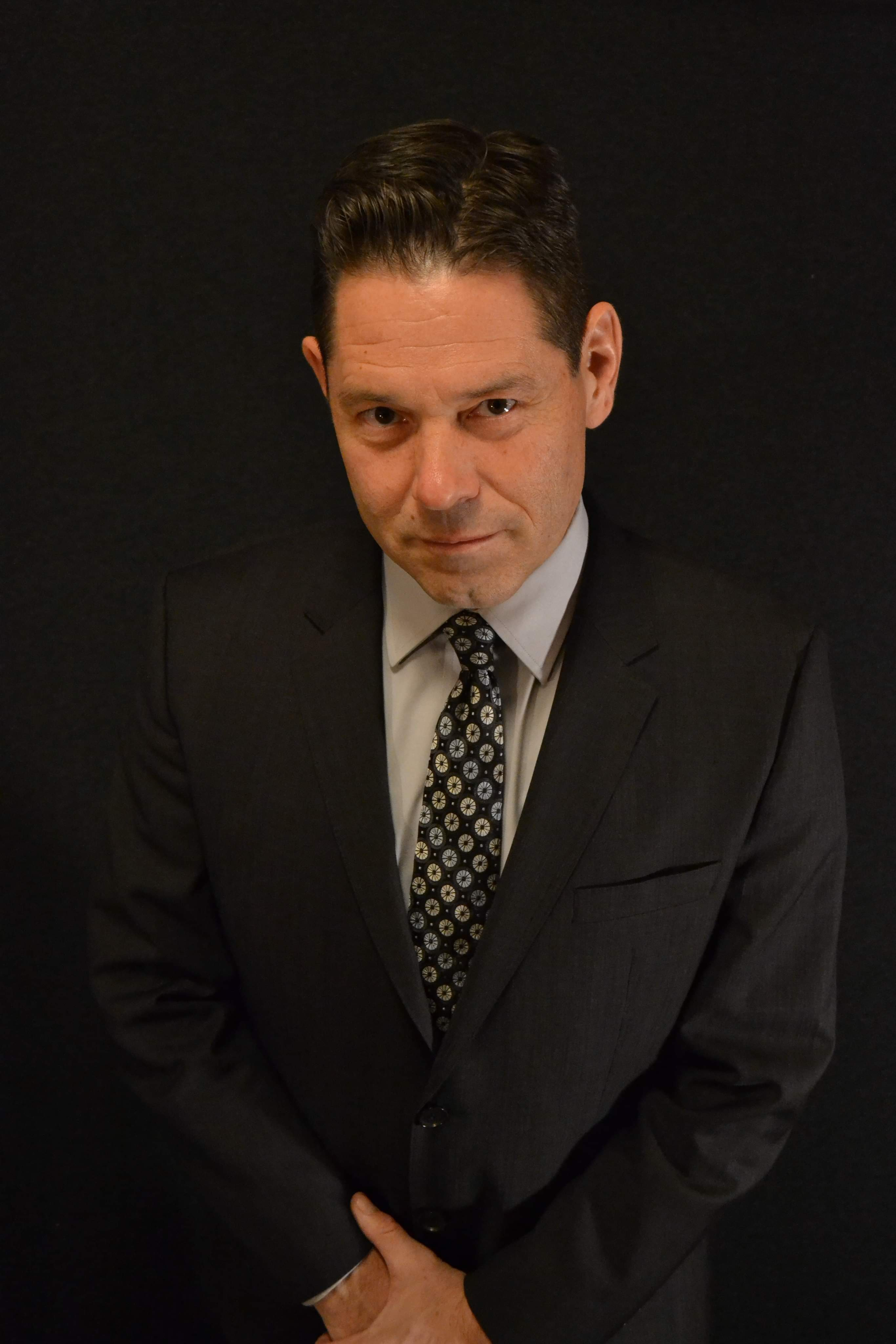
David Gunkel

David J. Gunkel (born September 9, 1962) is an American academic and Presidential Teaching Professor of Communication Studies at Northern Illinois University. He teaches courses in web design and programming, information and communication technology (ICT), and cyberculture. His research and publications examine the philosophical assumptions and ethical consequences of ICT.

He has served as the managing editor of the International Journal of Žižek Studies. Gunkel has published research and provided media commentary on the topics of machine ethics, the digital divide, telematic technologies, new media, Slavoj Žižek, as well as various aspects of internet culture and cyberculture.

He is the author over a dozen books. His first book, Hacking Cyberspace (2001), examines the metaphors applied to new technologies, and how those metaphors inform, shape, and drive the implementation of the technology in question. His second book, Thinking Otherwise: Philosophy, Communication, Technology (2007), investigates the unique quandaries, complications, and possibilities introduced by a form of 'otherness' that veils, through technology, the identity of the 'Other.' The Machine Question: Critical Perspectives on AI, Robots and Ethics (2012) which examines whether and to what extent intelligent and autonomous machines of our own making can be considered to have legitimate moral responsibilities and any legitimate claim to moral consideration. This book won "best book of the year" from the National Communication Association's (NCA) Communication Ethics Division.

Another piece on print culture and the transition to an electronic medium and culture titled What's the Matter with Books? has been cited in numerous articles on print culture and the digital revolution. In an article on remix titled Rethinking the Digital Remix: Mash-ups and the Metaphysics of Sound Recording has been subsequently referenced in books and articles on remix culture and mashups.

Gunkel published his fourth book, Heidegger and Media, which he wrote in collaboration with Paul A. Taylor of the University of Leeds (UK).

He has a PhD in philosophy from DePaul University (1996), where he wrote a dissertation on G.W.F. Hegel and an MA from Loyola University, Chicago. His BA was completed at the University of Wisconsin, Madison, where he earned a double major in philosophy and communication. He is married with one son.

Formed a rock group with Abe Glazer named 'Too Much Education', first album with same name released 1988. Recorded and mixed at Saw Mill studios Chicago, IL.

== Bibliography ==
- Gunkel, David J. (2023), Person, Thing, Robot: A Moral and Legal Ontology for the 21st Century and Beyond, MIT Press, ISBN 9780262546157
- Gunkel, David J. (2021), Deconstruction, MIT Press, ISBN 9780262542470
- Gunkel, David J. (2020), An Introduction to Communication and Artificial Intelligence, Wiley, ISBN 9781509533169
- Gunkel, David J. (2019), Žižek Studies: The Greatest Hits (so Far), Peter Lang, ISBN 9781433146176
- Gunkel, David J. (2019), How to Survive a Robot Invasion: Rights, Responsibility, and AI, Taylor & Francis, ISBN 9780429765261
- Gunkel, David J. (2018), Robot Rights, Project MUSE, ISBN 9780262038621
- Gunkel, David J. (2018), Gaming the System: Deconstructing Video Games, Games Studies, and Virtual Worlds, Indiana University Press, ISBN 9780253035738
- Gunkel, David J. (2016), Of Remixology: Ethics and Aesthetics After Remix, MIT Press, ISBN 9780262033930
- Gunkel, David J. (2016), The Changing Face of Alterity: Communication, Technology, and Other Subjects, Rowman & Littlefield International, ISBN 9781783488698
- Gunkel, David J. (2014), Heidegger and the Media, Polity Press, ISBN 978-0-7456-6126-1
- Gunkel, David J. (2012), The Machine Question: Critical Perspectives on AI, Robots, and Ethics, MIT Press, ISBN 978-0-2620-1743-5
- Gunkel, David J.; Gournelos, Ted (2011), Transgression 2.0: Media, Culture, and the Politics of a Digital Age, Continuum Press, ISBN 978-1-4411-6833-7
- Gunkel, David J. (2006), Thinking Otherwise: Philosophy, Communication, Technology., Purdue University Press, ISBN 1-55753-436-5
- Gunkel, David J. (2001), Hacking Cyberspace., Westview Press, ISBN 0-8133-3669-4
