= Techné: Research in Philosophy and Technology =

- Discipline: Philosophy
- Language: English
- Edited by: Kirk Besmer and Ashley Shew

Publication details
- Former names: Society for Philosophy and Technology Quarterly Electronic Journal
- History: 2000–present; 1995-1999 as the Society for Philosophy and Technology Quarterly Electronic Journal
- Publisher: Philosophy Documentation Center (United States)
- Frequency: Triannual

Standard abbreviations
- ISO 4: Techné

Indexing
- ISSN: 2691-5928
- LCCN: 2008247612
- OCLC no.: 43847807

Links
- Journal homepage; Online access; Special issues

Techné: Research in Philosophy and Technology is a peer-reviewed academic journal with a focus on philosophical analysis of technological systems. Established in 1995 as the Society for Philosophy and Technology Quarterly Electronic Journal, it has continuously published in electronic format under its present name since 2000. Techné is sponsored by the Society for Philosophy and Technology and published for the society by the Philosophy Documentation Center. The current editors-in-chief are Kirk Besmer and Stacey O. Irwin.

== Abstracting and indexing ==
The journal is abstracted and indexed in the following bibliographic databases:

- Associates Program Source
- ERIH PLUS
- Humanities International Index
- SCImago Journal Rank
- Scopus

== See also ==
- List of philosophy journals
