= Infosphere (disambiguation) =

Infosphere or InfoSphere may refer to the following:

- Infosphere, a term used to speculate about the common evolution of the Internet, society and culture
- IBM InfoSphere DataStage, an ETL software tool and part of the IBM Information Platforms Solutions suite that uses a graphical notation to construct data integration solutions
- The Infosphere, a massive biological memory bank in the animated series Futurama
