= Digital Nation =

Television documentary

Digital Nation: Life On The Virtual Frontier is an interactive website and Frontline documentary, first aired February 2, 2010, from Producer and Director Rachel Dretzin and correspondent Douglas Rushkoff. The website features segments from the film in production, blogs from the production team, and user-generated video and audio about experiences with technology. The documentary's premise is "to examine the risks and possibilities, myths and realities presented by the new digital culture we all inhabit" and "aims to capture life on the digital frontier and explore how the Web and digital media are changing the way we think, work, learn, and interact." Digital Nation has partnered with the Verizon Foundation to create this multiplatform initiative and is projected to air nationally on the Public Broadcasting Service (PBS) in early 2010.

== Website and participation ==
Recent features on the website include South Korea's professional online video gamers and stories gaming addiction, schools that are integrating technology in the classroom and the military's new techniques for training soldiers and treating post-traumatic stress disorder. Content is broken down by interest with subjects such as Living Faster, Military, Relationships, and Virtual Worlds.

The public is invited to participate in the making of Digital Nation by submitting personal stories about technology using video, photo collage, audio or animation, to the Your Digital Nation section of the website. Digital Nation partnered with Smith Magazine to create a memoir series called "6 Words on Digital Life," in which people choose six words that describe their digital lives.

Alongside promotion of user-generated content, the Digital Nation team will host internet safety workshops for teachers and parents, and create a curriculum for middle and high school students that will be available through the Digital Nation website, the Verizon Foundation's free educational website Thinkfinity.org, and WGBH-TV's Teachers' Domain.

== People ==
Digital Nation has interviewed prominent scholars and educators for the documentary, many of whom are featured on the website: Mark Bauerlein, Dr. Jerald Block, danah boyd, Anne Collier, Secretary of Education Arne Duncan, James Paul Gee, Henry Jenkins, Francoise LeGoues, Gloria Mark, Dr. Clifford Nass, Marc Prensky, Albert "Skip" Rizzo, Philip Rosedale, Noah Shachtman, P. W. Singer and Dr. Sherry Turkle.
