= Digital Visitor and Resident =

The Digital Visitor and Resident (V&R) model provides a framework to depict how user preference and habit motivates engagement with technology and the web. V&R is commonly described as a continuum, with two modes of online engagement at either end, making a separation between different approaches to engagement. People operating in Visitor mode have a defined goal or task, and select an appropriate online tool to meet their needs as they arise. For example, using a smartphone to search the internet for directions to a local bookstore, thus finding a particular piece of information online and then going offline to complete the task. There will be little in terms of social visibility or trace when online in Visitor mode. People operating in Resident mode are online to connect to, or to be with, other people. For example, posting to the wall in Facebook, tweeting, blogging, or posting comments on blogs. The web supports the projection of their identity and facilitates relationships. In other words, Residents live a percentage of their lives online. Unlike the Visitor mode, there will be online visibility and presence when in Resident mode. It is very common for individuals to engage online in a mixture of Visitor and Resident modes depending on what they are trying to achieve.

== Background ==
Marc Prensky's notions of digital natives and digital immigrants has had a lasting influence on how educational institutions perceive students and technology. However, Prensky's model has been challenged by other researchers who have debated its parameters. One of these new models is the V&R project. It contrasts with Presky's digital native in that it rejects hard divisions based on the age of the user, and instead focuses on the user's desired level of engagement.

== Mapping process ==
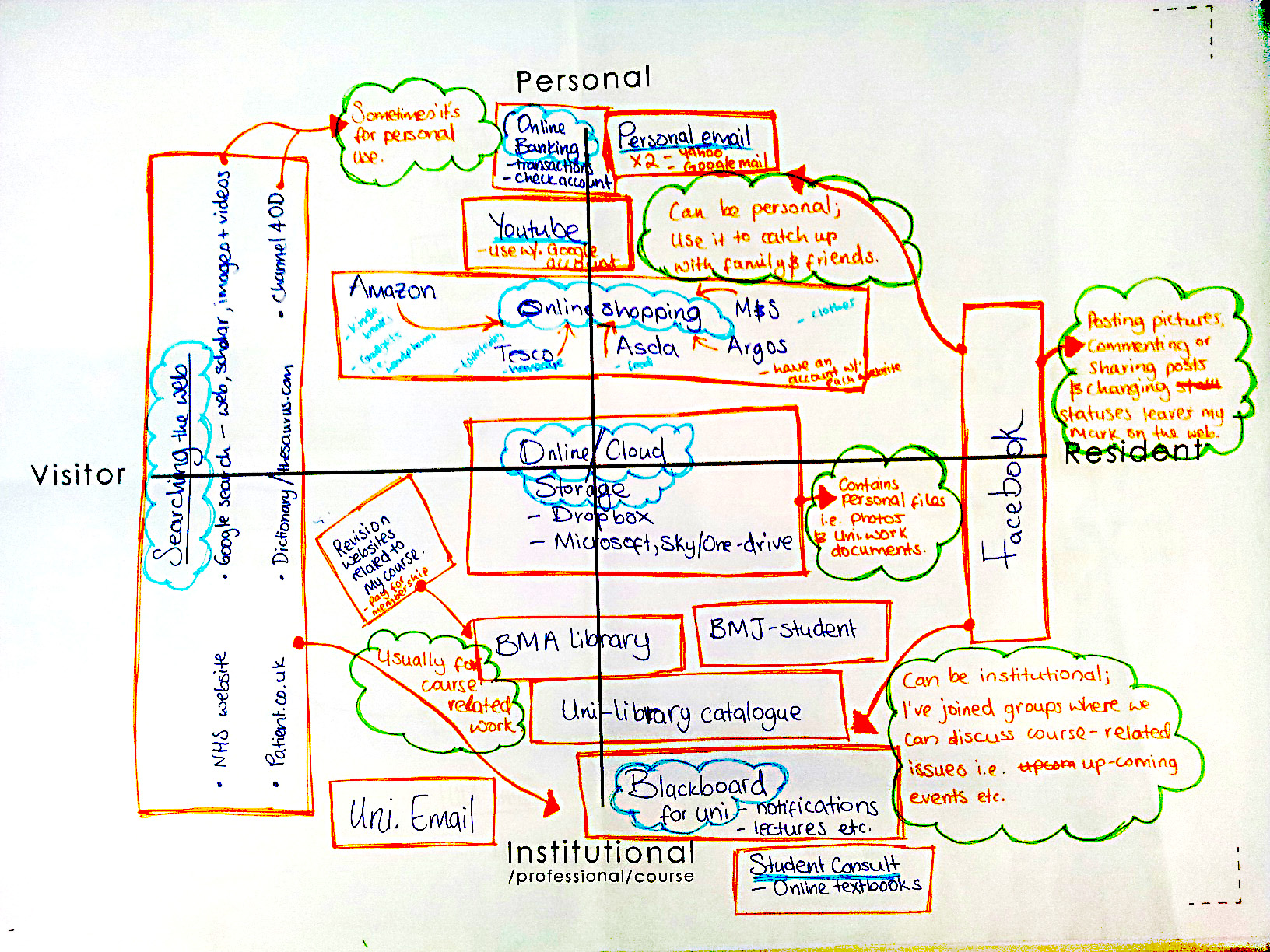
A detailed Digital Visitors and Residents map of online engagement from a Health and Social Care student in the UK

The Visitor-Resident continuum illustrates the range of possible modes of engagement individuals now have available to them through the web. The corresponding Digital Visitors and Residents mapping is a tool used by educators and librarians for exploring how their institutional users are engaging with the services they provide. By having students or users map their activity, they can create a picture of their overall engagement. Mapping also can be used to gain a picture of the overall digital presence of a group or department when bringing together and overlaying multiple maps.

== V&R study ==
The V&R project explored learners' motivations behind different types of engagement with the digital environment, when seeking information. The investigation focused on the sources learners turn to in order to gather information, and which on- and off-line spaces they choose to interact in as part of the learning process. The study used the Digital Visitors and Residents framework to map learners' modes of engagement in both personal and institutional contexts. The project assessed whether individual approaches shift according to the learners' educational stage or whether they develop practices/literacies in early stages that remain largely unchanged as they progress through their educational career. Learners from both the United Kingdom and the United States participated in the project.

The V&R project used both quantitative and qualitative methods for a mixed methods approach. The qualitative method of semi-structured interviews, sometimes accompanied by monthly diaries and follow-up interviews, was used to create a rich, descriptive longitudinal study of preselected individuals who represent the four educational stages (Emerging, Establishing, Embedding, and Experiencing). Findings, to date, indicate that behavior patterns vary by the participants' educational stage rather than by their age, which varies within each stage. This categorization, by educational stages rather than age, contrasts with Prensky's "natives and immigrants" paradigm. However, the V&R notion reflects that individual choices about technology and information seeking derive from context— that is, from individuals' educational and professional priorities — rather than from their age.

The findings also indicate that people still rely on other people to get information, especially those within their personal networks. Individuals make decisions based on convenience within the context of their information needs and the situation within which the need arises. Web-based functionalities are the expected norm for services by many people, as the sources that people chose are overwhelmingly digital. Interviewees mentioned search engines and social media sites far more often than physical places, when looking for information. This reliance on digital spaces coexists with a persistent need to be in contact with other people both online and face to face. Individuals expect to use their own technology to connect with institutional (and other) resources, and to engage in Resident modes of behavior. There is also an underlying perception, particularly by US students, that sources such as Wikipedia should be avoided, creating a “learning black market” where these sources are covertly used and not mentioned. Mentions of the free web, as represented by major media sites and Wikipedia, also far outnumbered mentions of university databases or course management systems such as Moodle, even among graduate students. Participants in all of the educational stages frequently mentioned convenience/ease of use as an important factor in obtaining information.

Undoubtedly, people seek what they need within their existing relationships, and as they move through the educational stages, their networks are increasingly populated with people who have relevant subject expertise. By the time individuals become faculty members, calling a "friend" about an article indefinitely means the friend is also an expert in the field. Relationships are a major factor in how individuals get information and whom they choose for collaboration. The desire to make contact with others also motivates people to engage with technology.

== Recommendations ==
Services and systems need to be embedded into individual's workflow. Therefore, the institution should provide a broad range of tools for gathering information and create simple and convenient interface designs. Institutions should also eliminate any barriers between information discovery and access, along with the promotion and marketing of services academic communities. Institutions should use individual Internet practices as a guide to linking institutional resources to those on the open web by conversing with their academic constituencies and using what they already know about people using Wikipedia. It is also important to ensure that the library, or institution, has a diverse presence in digital and physical spaces, and engages in innovative strategies for making library collections come to life, using social media.

== InfoKit ==
The infoKit draws on the findings and methods of the Jisc/OCLC funded Digital Visitors and Residents (V&R) project which is underpinned by an alternative to Prensky's typing of technology users. It contains advice on evaluating the services you offer to your users. The focus is primarily on digital/online services but set within the broader context of more traditional services, exploring the relationship between the two.

== See also ==
- Networked learning
- Millennials
- Generation Z
- Homo Ludens
- Information society
- Online identity
