= Douglas Rushkoff =

American writer and media theorist

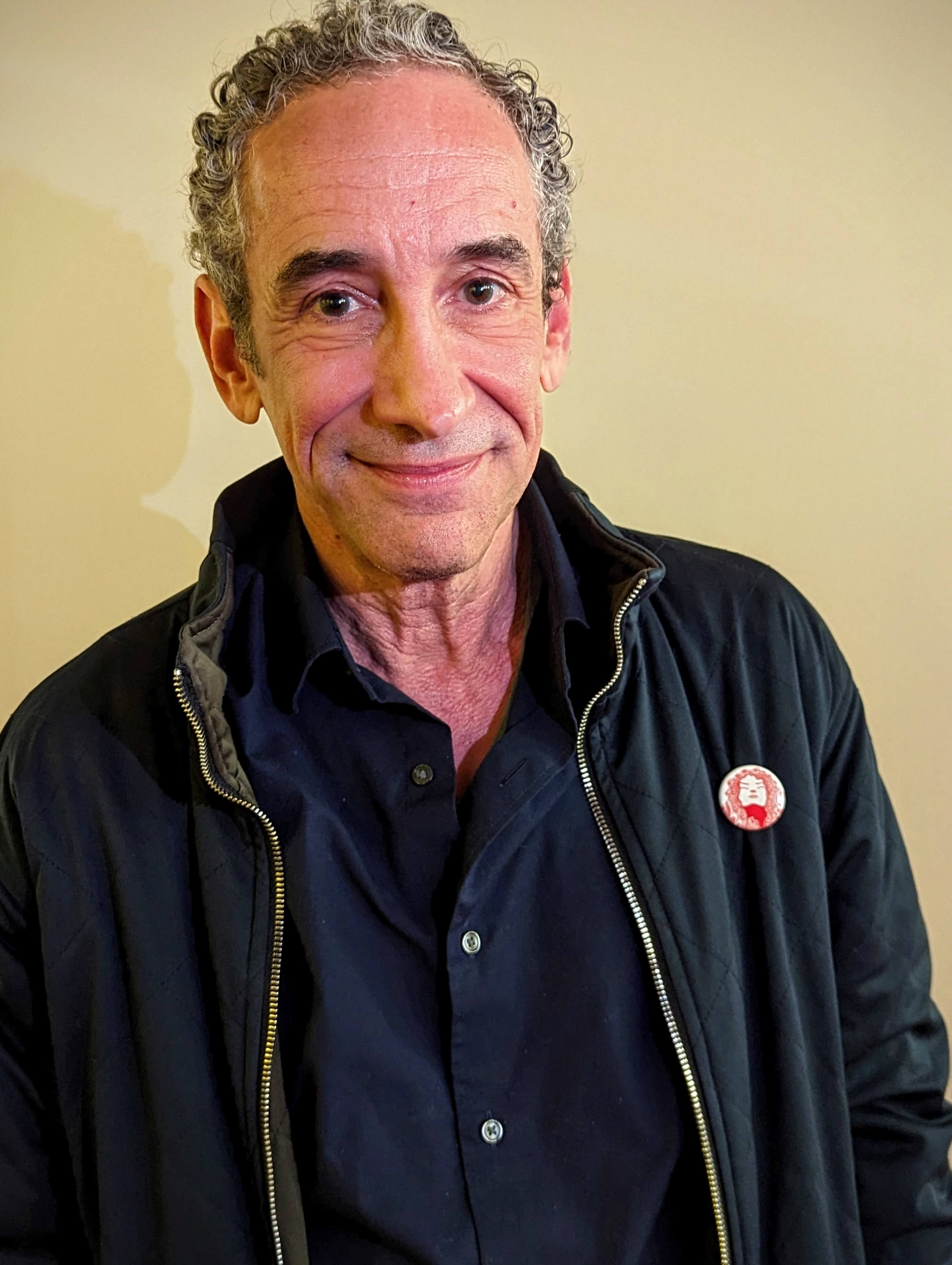
- Douglas Rushkoff at 2023 SXSW
- Born: February 18, 1961 (age 65); New York City, US
- Education: Princeton University (BA); California Institute of the Arts (MFA); American Film Institute; Utrecht University (PhD)
- Occupations: Media theorist, writer, columnist, lecturer, graphic novelist, documentarian
- Writing career
- Subject: American media
- Website: rushkoff.com

Douglas Mark Rushkoff (born February 18, 1961) is an American media theorist, writer, professor, columnist, lecturer, graphic novelist, documentarian and podcaster. He is best known for his association with the early cyberpunk culture, his advocacy of open source solutions to social problems, his critique of technocapitalism, and his call to retrieve our humanity in a digital age.

Rushkoff is most frequently regarded as a media theorist and is known for coining terms and concepts including viral media (or media virus), digital native, and social currency. He has written fourteen books on media, technology and culture, as well as several novels and graphic novels. He wrote the first syndicated column on cyberculture for The New York Times Syndicate, as well as regular columns for The Guardian, Arthur, Discover, and the online magazines Daily Beast, and TheFeature.

Rushkoff is currently Professor of Media Theory and Digital Economics at the City University of New York, Queens College. He has previously lectured at The New School university in Manhattan and the Interactive Telecommunications Program at New York University's Tisch School of the Arts, where he created the Narrative Lab. He also has taught online for the Maybe Logic Academy. In 2012, Rushkoff was declared the sixth most influential thinker in the world by MIT Technology Review and the Gottlieb Duttweiler Institute, following Steven Pinker, David Graeber, Nobel Prize-winner Daniel Kahneman, Thilo Sarrazin, and Richard Florida. On March 9, 2026, Rushkoff announced that he had been confirmed as a permanent member of the Club of Rome.

== Early life, education and works ==
Rushkoff was born in New York City, New York, of Jewish heritage to Sheila, a psychiatric social worker, and Marvin Rushkoff, a hospital administrator.

Rushkoff graduated from Princeton University in 1983. He moved to Los Angeles and completed a Master of Fine Arts in Directing from the California Institute of the Arts. Later he took up a post-graduate fellowship from the American Film Institute. He was a PhD candidate at Utrecht University's New Media Program, writing a dissertation on new media literacies, which was approved in June, 2012.

Free Rides, Rushkoff’s first book, in 1991, commissioned by film producer Patrick Wells, was a compendium of ways to alter consciousness without drugs. Rushkoff’s contention was that it was the states of consciousness, and not the chemicals themselves, that made psychedelic culture so threatening to mainstream society.

== Mass media theorist ==
Rushkoff emerged in the early 1990s as an active member of the cyberpunk and the cyberdelic movements, developing friendships and collaborations with people including Timothy Leary, RU Sirius, Paul Krassner, Robert Anton Wilson, Ralph Abraham, Terence McKenna, Genesis P-Orridge, Ralph Metzner, Grant Morrison, Mark Pesce, Erik Davis and other writers, artists and philosophers interested in the intersection of technology, society and culture.

Cyberia, widely acknowledged as the first book on cyberculture, was inspired by the San Francisco rave scene of the early 1990s. The initially planned publication was scrapped, however; in Rushkoff's words, "in 1992 Bantam canceled the book because they thought by 1993 the internet would be over." It was eventually published in 1994. Among other things, the book documented the role of psychedelics in the development of the personal computer and associated networking technologies, and warned of the potential for business interests associated with Wired magazine to “hijack” the net from the more countercultural interests celebrated by cyberpunks, artists, and writers associated with Mondo2000.

In his book Media Virus, Rushkoff coined the term “viral media,” using the Rodney King tape as the first example of a new media form: an unprofessional media artifact that nonetheless spread throughout the “datasphere” (another Rushkoff term), caused an ideological contagion, and eventually led to riots in a dozen American cities. Rushkoff analyzed media phenomena from Madonna and Michael Jackson to computer viruses and Beavis and Butt-Head as examples of mutating viral forms, dependent on “hidden agendas in popular culture” for their transmission and reproduction.

The datasphere as a concept in Media Virus was popularized by Rushkoff as advocate of cyberpunk culture and open-source solutions to social problems, in the 1980s. He approached the datasphere as the "circulatory system for today's information, ideas and images", understood as "our new natural environment". Rushkoff's conceptualization, centered in media theory, was deployed to explain how 'media viruses' – ideas that capture public attention – rapidly spread. As such, Rushkoff's datasphere invokes ideas of information flow, rather than being focused on structured data and its analysis.

Soon after Rushkoff published Media Virus in 1995, as his books became more accepted, and his concepts of the "media virus" and "social contagion" became mainstream ideas, Rushkoff was invited to deliver commentaries on National Public Radio's All Things Considered, and to make documentaries for the PBS series Frontline. Rushkoff was disappointed, however, that his book was received most enthusiastically by marketers, who employed the ideas for what became known as “viral marketing.”

In 2002, Rushkoff was awarded the Marshall McLuhan Award by the Media Ecology Association for his book Coercion, and became a member and sat on the board of directors of that organization. This allied him with the "media ecologists", a continuation of what is known as the Toronto School of media theorists including Marshall McLuhan, Walter Ong, and Neil Postman.

Simultaneously, Rushkoff continued to develop his relationship with counterculture figures, collaborating with Genesis P-Orridge as a keyboardist for Psychic TV, and credited with composing music for the album Hell Is Invisible... Heaven Is Her/e. Rushkoff taught classes in media theory and in media subversion for New York University's Interactive Telecommunications Program, participated in activist pranks with the Yes Men and eToy, contributed to numerous books and documentaries on psychedelics, and spoke or appeared at many events sponsored by counterculture publisher Disinformation.

Rushkoff has also collaborated with author, speaker, and podcaster Mitch Horowitz, known for his work on occult and esoteric history and ideas. In 2023, the two did a live talk on stage at an event titled "Can Magick Save Us? – Team Human Live in NYC," and Horowitz has been a recurring guest on Rushkoff's podcast, where they have explored questions and challenges of technology, media, and psychology.

=== Influences ===
References to media ecologist and Toronto School of Communication founder Marshall McLuhan appear throughout Rushkoff's work as a focus on media over content, the effects of media on popular culture and the level at which people participate when consuming media.

Rushkoff worked with both Robert Anton Wilson and Timothy Leary on developing philosophical systems to explain consciousness, its interaction with technology, and social evolution of the human species, and references both consistently in his work. Leary, along with John Perry Barlow and Terence McKenna characterized the mid-1990s as techno-utopian, and saw the rapid acceleration of culture, emerging media and the unchecked advancement of technology as completely positive. Rushkoff's own unbridled enthusiasm for cyberculture was tempered by the dotcom boom, when the non-profit character of the Internet was rapidly overtaken by corporations and venture capital. Rushkoff often cites two events in particular – the day Netscape became a public company in 1995, and the day AOL bought Time Warner in 2000 – as pivotal moments in his understanding of the forces at work in the evolution of new media.

Rushkoff spent several years exploring Judaism as a primer for media literacy, going so far as to publish a book inviting Jews to restore the religion to its "open source" roots. He founded a movement for progressive Judaism called Reboot, but subsequently left when he felt its funders had become more concerned with marketing and publicity of Judaism than its actual improvement and evolution.

Disillusioned by the failure of the open source model to challenge entrenched and institutional hierarchies from religion to finance, he became a colleague of Mark Crispin Miller and Naomi Klein, appearing with them at Smith College as well as in numerous documentaries decrying the corporatization of public space and consciousness. He has dedicated himself most recently to the issues of media literacy, participatory government, and the development of local and complementary currencies. He wrote a book and film called Life Inc., which traces the development of corporatism and centralized currency from the Renaissance to today, and hosted a radio show called The Media Squat on WFMU from 2008 to 2009, concerned with reclaiming commerce and culture from corporate domination.

=== Influence ===
In September 2020, Rushkoff commented on the release of the documentary The Social Dilemma. This was partly based on the prompting from his fanbase that expressed that the ideas in the film were direct quotations from his books and films. Rushkoff speculated at the possibility that the programmers interviewed in the film have read something from himself, or other writers such as Nicholas Carr, Sherry Turkle, Andrew Keen, Howard Rheingold, Richard Barbrook, Tim Wu, or even the singer Raffi. He acknowledged that while their work and analogies are being quoted without acknowledgement of their source, that these quotations serve as memes themselves and are indicative of their sustaining value beyond their original authors. Jaron Lanier, who was a subject in Rushkoff's Cyberia years before, is one of the people included in the documentary. Rushkoff also acknowledged he got a call from the Center for Humane Technology stating that they are starting a new organization called Team Humanity, which is a direct wordplay from Rushkoff's podcast Team Human. Rushkoff asked his fanbase to not act negatively toward this appropriation, and to be inclusive of this new community in order to open up a new dialogue between the groups.

=== Awards and appointments ===
Douglas Rushkoff has been on the board of directors of the Media Ecology Association, The Center for Cognitive Liberty and Ethics, and is a founding member of Technorealism, as well as of the advisory board of The National Association for Media Literacy Education, MeetUp.com and HyperWords

He is the winner of the first Neil Postman Award for Career Achievement in Public Intellectual Activity, given by the Media Ecology Association, in 2004.

== Themes ==
=== General ===
Douglas Rushkoff's philosophy developed from a techno-utopian view of new media to a more nuanced critique of cyberculture discourse and the impact of media on society. Viewing everything except for intention as media, he explores the themes of how to make media interactive, how to help people (especially children) effectively analyze and question the media they consume, as well as how to cultivate intention and agency. He has discussed religion, culture, politics, and money.

=== Technology and cyberculture ===
Up to the late-1990s, Douglas Rushkoff's philosophy towards technology could be characterized as media-deterministic. Cyberculture and new media were supposed to promote democracy and allow people to transcend the ordinary.

In Cyberia, Rushkoff states the essence of mid-1990s culture as being the fusion of rave psychedelia, chaos theory and early computer networks. The promise of the resulting "counter culture" was that media would change from being passive to active, that we would embrace the social over content, and that empowers the masses to create and react.

This idea also comes up in the concept of the media virus, which Rushkoff details in the 1994 publication of Media Virus: Hidden Agendas in Popular Culture. This significant work adopts organic metaphors to show that media, like viruses, are mobile, easily duplicated and presented as non-threatening. Technologies can make our interaction with media an empowering experience if we learn to decode the capabilities offered to us by our media. Unfortunately, people often stay one step behind our media capabilities. Ideally, emerging media and technologies have the potential to enlighten, to aid grassroots movements, to offer an alternative to the traditional "top-down" media, to connect diverse groups and to promote the sharing of information.

Playing the Future (1996)

In 1996 Rushkoff published Playing the Future, about the generation of people growing up who understand the language of media like natives.

Playing the Future argued that interactive media was preparing young people, who he called screenagers, a term originated by Rushkoff, and digital natives, to surf rather than drown in a sea of media and data overload.

Ecstasy Club (1997) Rushkoff's first fictional work, the novel Ecstasy Club covers many of the same subjects as his non-fiction work Cyberia, but as a black comedy about a cultish group of young people forging a rave collective in Oakland. Rushkoff considers the way that egos and hype undermine the possibilities for a digital utopia. The explosion and fire at the Oakland warehouse in the book foreshadowed the later Ghost Ship tragedy.

With Coercion (1999), Rushkoff explored the way classic manipulation and persuasion techniques were about to be adapted for use online and in other interactive contexts. The book explains traditional persuasion, such as spectacles, salesmanship, casinos, and cults, then shows how each of the features of these styles of persuasion are being, or will soon be, leveraged by technology and media companies through automation and algorithms.

In 2002, Rushkoff was awarded the Marshall McLuhan Award by the Media Ecology Association for his book Coercion, and became a member and sat on the board of directors of that organization.[23]

=== Religion ===
In Nothing Sacred: The Truth About Judaism, Rushkoff explores the medium of religion and intellectually deconstructs the Bible and the ways that he says religion fails to provide true connectivity and transformative experiences.

=== Magic and the Supernatural ===
On February 2, 2023, Rushkoff proclaimed to the world that "Magic is Real", the title of his Medium post in which Rushkoff related two improbable events he claimed to have experienced. Rushkoff continued to explore these themes of magic and the limits of scientific thinking in his blogs in 2023, 2024, 2025.

=== Currency ===
Most recently, Douglas Rushkoff has turned his critical lens to the medium of currency. One of the most important concepts that he creates and develops is the notion of social currency, or the degree to which certain content and media can facilitate and/or promote relationships and interactions between members of a community. Rushkoff mentions jokes, scandals, blogs, ambiance, i.e. anything that would engender "water cooler" talk, as social currency.

In his book, Life, Inc. and his dissertation "Monopoly Moneys", Rushkoff takes a look at physical currency and the history of corporatism. Beginning with an overview of how money has been gradually centralized throughout time, and pondering the reasons and consequences of such a fact, he goes on to demonstrate how our society has become defined by and controlled by corporate culture.

=== Social media ===
Rushkoff has long been skeptical of social media. On February 25, 2013, he announced in a CNN op-ed that he was leaving Facebook, citing concerns about the company's use of his personal data. In 2023, he announced his departure from X and other social media platforms, explaining, "And Twitter has no tolerance for ambiguity. It's missing the moderated, the emotional, the poetic...the whole human experience."

=== Wealth and power ===
In his most recent work, Survival of the Richest: Escape Fantasies of the Tech Billionaires (2022), Rushkoff explored the calculus some of the extremely wealthy make in the recognition that their often single-minded pursuit of greater profits and better technology are creating an increasingly unstable world. In a 2022 talk for House of SpeakEasy's Seriously Entertaining program, Rushkoff explained the billionaires' mindset as coming down to this essential question: "How much money and technology do I need to insulate myself from the reality I'm creating by earning money and using technology in this way?" He argues that treating people better in the present may be the most surefire way to avoid widespread catastrophe in the future.

== Bibliography ==
=== Articles ===
- "Team Human vs. Team AI", Strategy+Business, February 5, 2019.

=== Books ===
- 1991. Free Rides: How To Get High Without Drugs ISBN 978-0-385-30331-6
- 1994. Cyberia: Life in the Trenches of Cyberspace ISBN 978-1-903083-24-6
- 1994. The GenX Reader (Editor, contributor) ISBN 978-0-345-39046-2
- 1995. Media Virus: Hidden Agendas in Popular Culture ISBN 978-0-345-39774-4
- 1996. Playing the Future: What We Can Learn From Digital Kids ISBN 978-1-57322-764-3 (Published in the UK in 1997 as "Children of Chaos: Surviving the End of the World as We Know it" ISBN 0-00-654879-2)
- 1999. Coercion: Why We Listen to What "They" Say ISBN 978-1-57322-829-9
- 2003. Nothing Sacred: The Truth About Judaism ISBN 978-1-4000-5139-7
- 2003. Open Source Democracy A Demos Essay
- 2005. Get Back in the Box: Innovation from the Inside Out ISBN 978-0-06-075869-1
- 2009. Foreword: The Opportunity for Renaissance, pp. 273–281, in Be The Media, David Mathison, editor
- 2009. Life, Inc.: How the World Became A Corporation and How To Take It Back ISBN 978-1-4000-6689-6
- 2010. Program or be Programmed: Ten Commands for a Digital Age Paperback ISBN 978-1-935928-15-7 Ebook ISBN 978-1-935928-16-4
- 2013. Present Shock: When Everything Happens Now ISBN 978-1-59184-476-1
- 2016. Throwing Rocks at the Google Bus ISBN 978-1-61723-017-2
- 2019. Team Human ISBN 978-0-393-65169-0
- 2022. Survival of the Richest ISBN 978-0-393-88106-6
- 2024. Program or Be Programmed: Eleven Commands for the AI Future Paperback ISBN 978-1-68219-435-5 Ebook ISBN 978-1-68219-436-2

=== Book chapters ===
- Douglas Rushkoff (2019). "Chapter 8: Survival of the richest". In Extinction Rebellion (ed.). This Is Not a Drill: An Extinction Rebellion Handbook. Penguin Books. pp. 58–64. ISBN 978-0-14-199144-3.

=== Fiction works ===
- 1997. Ecstasy Club ISBN 978-1-57322-702-5
- 2002. Exit Strategy (aka Bull) ISBN 978-1-887128-90-2`

=== Graphic novels ===
- 2004. Club Zero-G ISBN 978-0-9729529-3-4
- 2005–2008. Testament ISBN 978-1-4012-1063-2
- 2012. A.D.D. – Adolescent Demo Division ISBN 978-1-78116-019-0
- 2016. Aleister and Adolf with Michael Avon Oeming ISBN 978-1-5067-0104-2

== Documentaries ==
- 2001. Merchants of Cool, a groundbreaking, award-winning Frontline documentary which explores the people, marketing techniques and ideologies behind popular culture for teenagers. This video attempts to answer whether or not teen popular culture is reflective of its population or manufactured by big business and related groups.
- 2004. The Persuaders. This Frontline documentary examines the psychological techniques behind popular marketing and advertising trends, determines how these methods influence how we view ourselves and desires, and postulates on the future implications of these persuasive approaches at work.
- 2009. Life Inc. The Movie
- 2009–2010. Digital Nation, Life on the Virtual Frontier. Web site and documentary, PBS Frontline.
- 2008. American Music: OFF THE RECORD Dir. Benjamin Meade, Cosmic Cowboy Studio.
- 2014. Generation Like. PBS Frontline.

=== Radio ===
- The Media Squat (creator and host): freeform, bottom-up, open source WFMU radio which examines similarly open source, bottom-up solutions to social problems.
- Team Human Podcast (creator and host): a weekly interview show focused on themes of inspecting and subverting technology's effect on human behaviour.
