= Inforg =

An inforg is an informationally embodied organism, entity made up of information, that exists in the infosphere. These informationally embodied organisms are also called natural agents.

== Description ==
Inforgs was used by Luciano Floridi to describe what makes up an infosphere. The usage of the word describes organisms that are made up of information rather than "standalone and unique entities". This description of inforgs allows them to exist in the infosphere as natural agents alongside artificial agents. Inforgs can be part of a hybrid agent that is, for example, a family with digital devices such as digital cameras, cell phones, tablets, and laptops.

Norbert Wiener describes organisms as entities defined by patterns of persisting Shannon information. Shannon information, named after Claude Shannon, places information in the physical realm allowing it to be manipulated by the laws of nature and science. Thus, inforgs are composed of matter, energy, and Shannon information. An experiment that supports inforgs and the component of Shannon information is the use of DNA as a medium for data storage. Encoding DNA, which is considered to be the building blocks of organisms, to hold binary information reinforces the idea that living organisms are "persisting patterns of Shannon information encoded within an ever-changing flux of matter-energy".

The Shannon information that is found within an inforg also contains the identity of said organism. For example, a human being's identity is not matter or energy but rather encoded by patterns of Shannon information within their body. While a person's body may change over time, their identity persists through time. The manipulation of Shannon information in an inforg is under what is called the metaphysical realm.

== See also ==
- Luciano Floridi
- Infosphere
- Information
- Shannon information
- Metaphysics
- Information Revolution
- Information Age
- Digital Transformation
