= Digital phobic =

Digital phobic is an informal phrase used to describe a reluctance to become fully immersed in the digital age for being fearful of how it might negatively change or alter everyday life.

The fast-paced development of the digital world in the twenty-first century has contributed to the digital divide becoming a problem for a segment of the population for whom a lack of education of, interest in, or access to digital devices has left them excluded from the technological world and fearful of its growing omnipresence.

Digital phobic is part of a growing dictionary of digital vocabulary exploring the social impact of the technological age. The phrase considers the fears associated with technological evolution and change, and acknowledges the possibility of exclusion as a result of a rising reliance on technology in day-to-day life.

== Discourse ==
Everyday use of technology has increased dramatically since the turn of the century, significantly impacting both those embracing technological change as well as those reluctant to be a part of it.

A sharp rise in technological innovations during the 21st century has been responsible for changing much of the way we work, socialize, and learn – all of which can be at the foundation of distrust in the technological age. Psychologists, academics and researchers have begun to consider the base of these fears and consider the social, cultural and environmental circumstances which might catalyze someone to becoming 'digital phobic'.

Technophobia is used to discuss a fear of advanced technology in a formal capacity and can stem from a number, and combination of, concerns. With the oncoming of the digital age, worries have broadened from the very earliest fears that technology would eradicate artisanship to concerns over data protection, financial security, identity theft, technical inability and invasion of privacy.

There is no exhaustible list of reasons cited for fearing the digital world and, whilst research into both the cause and consequence of developing a digital phobia remains in its infancy, the presence of digital phobia regardless contributes towards an increasingly comprehensive picture of a series of profiles among digital users.

Recent research from Foresters, an international financial services organization, found 2% of the UK population to fall into this category of internet user. A further breakdown of this statistic, sees the percentage of users in development of a digital phobia increase, with 4% fearful of online shopping for worrying that someone will steal their card details, and 12% fearful that using social media will make it easier for people to find their personal details.

When asked to reason their attitude towards technology as part of this survey, a larger percentage of the UK population were revealed to be fearful of the impact it could be having on more traditional means of doing things. 31% believed technology was preventing us from communicating properly, while 32% thought advances in technology will result in long-held traditions being lost.

This fear has only been exacerbated over time as more and more data-holding, services and opportunities are transferred to the digital realm, and both the perceived and real nature of security and vulnerability risks increases. Worrying levels of time spent on devices, the invasion of privacy or the possible misuse or abuse of personal data entrusted to online sources are all contributing towards the development of a digital phobia among a proportion of the population.

Concerns about the negative, exclusionary or divisive consequences of living within a digital society are being voiced from various global platforms. April 2014 research conducted by Pew Research Center, in association with Smithsonian Magazine, revealed concerns about anticipated technological developments over the next half-century. 30% of Americans surveyed feared that technological changes would lead to a future in which people are worse off than they are at the time of being surveyed. Considered amid reports of dis-interest in the internet among Japan's residents despite its reputation as a high-tech nation, these reports contribute towards a growing understanding that high-tech advancements are not universally celebrated. Moreover, the May 2014 "right to be forgotten" ruling put in place in the European Union which allows internet users to request for their internet history to be un-searchable if deemed incorrect, outdated or irrelevant, and the thousands of requests received in the first few days following its announcement documents a, perhaps previously hidden, widespread fear of leaving a digital footprint or being falsely represented online.

== Origins ==
Digital phobia is part of a wider societal conversation on how we relate to, trust in, and interact with technology and considers the potentially negative implications of what otherwise appears to be a positive advancement of the modern world.

This phrase has been developed by Foresters, the international financial services organisation, for the purpose of describing attitudes to technology among the UK population.

Developed within a digital vocabulary consisting of four other phrases (digital addict, digital omnivore, digital agnostic, digital denier), digital phobic is part of a scale of social description for online behavior within the digital age.

The phrase has been used as part of discussion on the more general use of technology within the 21st century and the importance of striking a balance between time spent on and offline. Research conducted by Foresters in association with Tech Timeout, a social communications initiative considering the role of technology in contemporary society, formed the basis of the descriptor and identified the key traits of each type of digital user based on answers from over 1,000 UK respondents.

Both anecdotal and research-based evidence suggests categories of internet use, whilst they cannot be linearly divided, are able to loosely describe attitudes to technology in society. The developed phrases are able to be used to greater understand and contextualize how new and existing technology is viewed and have been cited in international online newspapers and blog posts.

Whilst this phrase and definition were developed specifically from research on UK technology-users, the phrase is not UK-specific and is designed to be indicative of a global community of technology users who share in these characteristics.

== Social and cultural impact ==
Digital phobia is characterized as problem in the modern world with regards to technology as a central and essential resource. Internet culture has developed to have effects on everyday life and is now even considered part of the make-up of national identity with a country's internet use and digital footprint an important modern index for international comparison, often associated with development and modernity.

The consequences of non-participation in the digital world are far reaching, and can affect the economic, cultural, social, occupational and educational life of a non-user. For example, in 2009 Price Waterhouse Coopers estimated that UK households offline are missing out on savings of £560 a year which could be saved if shopping or paying for bills online. Furthermore, in the United States older people without internet access or the skills to make the most of it are considered a disadvantaged proportion of the population as, amongst other important resources, vital healthcare information and initiatives conducted online are unavailable to those not a part of the digital world.

Heightened fears of how technology may be affecting the human population stems from a, for some very logical, fear of how technology is adapting the world we live in and at the pace and price with which it is doing so. With such a significance placed on online participation, concerns about the role of the internet in everyday life are not unfounded and not exclusive to those who prefer to stay away from the internet, avoid certain activities online, or use the internet without enthusiasm and only as necessitated.

A survey conducted by security firm Avira identified 84% of people fear social networking sites will steal or misuse their personal information, demonstrating the net majority of internet users share, at least partially, in distrusting the digital world. Whilst many will, despite this fear, adopt cautious optimism and still use social networking as part of their everyday lives this high percentage serves to demonstrate that a fear significant enough for some to avoid readily using online and digital services is a fear shared by a large number of internet users.

Whilst some digital phobics have preferred to remain distanced from technology due to hypothetical concerns others have attempted to join in societal interest but find themselves unable to stay caught up with new technology or would like to see its progression halted as evolution of the digital world has reached new speeds. The 2013 Oxford Internet Survey recognizes this concern among UK users, identifying distinct categories of both non-users and ex-users of internet-based technology who, for a variety of reasons, have discontinued or refuse to access the online world. This is further supported by results from a 2013 survey of internet use in America which found 32% of non-internet users avoiding the online world because of finding the internet difficult or frustrating to use, being physically unable or worried about other issues such as viruses, threat of hacking or spam – a figure considerably higher than in earlier years.

Concern over the presence of a digital divide, whether locally or globally, is only exacerbated by the knowledge that access to many government and council services, job applications, and social and cultural resources are now largely internet based. Internet access has become a hurdle in contemporary society which, for those without the necessary desire to learn or knowledge of internet-based systems, can be difficult to navigate around, often resulting in key services and vital resources being less easily accessible, leaving non-users feeling isolated. Private and government campaigns to tackle this issue further demonstrate the severity and long-lasting impact of having a proportion of the population disinclined or disinterested in going online.

As the online world becomes saturated, device options for connecting to the internet vary and news of technological inventions goes viral the exponential growth of the technological world is only contributing towards a growing number of 'digital phobic' tech-users amongst the global population.

== Education ==
Digital phobia has had a negative impact on the field of education. Some teachers have expressed a fear that new and advanced technology is supplanting them as the masters of their fields of study and a study of teachers in Wilmington, Delaware has shown that educators in this area are acclimating to the new technology in their classrooms at a slower pace. The local researchers believe that there are many factors why that is the case and some of the things they have found are things such as a lack of technological education by the teachers, and also the lack of time, or incentive to adjust to the new technology. University Larry Cuban has stated that "The introduction of computers into school was supposed to improve academic achievement, and alter how teachers taught. Neither has occurred."

The constant infusion of new technology has many teachers fearing that they are losing their classroom. This new technology is essentially diminishing the role of a teacher in the classroom.

Researchers believe that educators are slow to adapt to technology because they aren't given time to acclimate to the new technology, causing them to hesitate to use it in the classroom and express fear that these technologies may interfere with genuine learning particularly in humanities and creative subjects. In an article for the New Media Reader, Theodor H. Nelson wrote that people are opposed to the computer because they believe it is "cold" and "inhuman", but a human can be just as inhuman and maybe even more so than the actual machine itself.

== See also ==
- Digital Age
- Digital detox
- Digital divide
- Digital native
- Internet addiction disorder
- Technophobia
