= TheFeature =

TheFeature.com was an online magazine and community dedicated to covering the technological, cultural and business evolution of the mobile Internet and the wider mobile telecommunications industry.

== History ==
Sponsored by Nokia, it was launched in August 2000 and continued through June 2005. Over the years, TheFeature became known for seeding innovative ideas in the nascent mobile internet industry.

== Authors ==
The magazine's authors included Howard Rheingold, Douglas Rushkoff, Mark Frauenfelder, David Pescovitz, Justin Hall, Kevin Werbach, Carol Posthumus, and Steve Wallage, among others.

== Design ==
TheFeature was designed by Razorfish from 2000 until 2003. Sascha Höhne redesigned the site in 2004, and all subsequent iterations through 2005.

TheFeature had the distinction of being nominated for two Webby Awards in 2005, one in each of the Magazine and Telecommunications categories.

== Editors ==
TheFeature's editor-in-chief was Justin Ried, and its executive editors were Carlo Longino and Malathy Eskola.

== See also ==
- DailyTech
- IT Examiner
- Digital Trends
