= Digital omnivore =

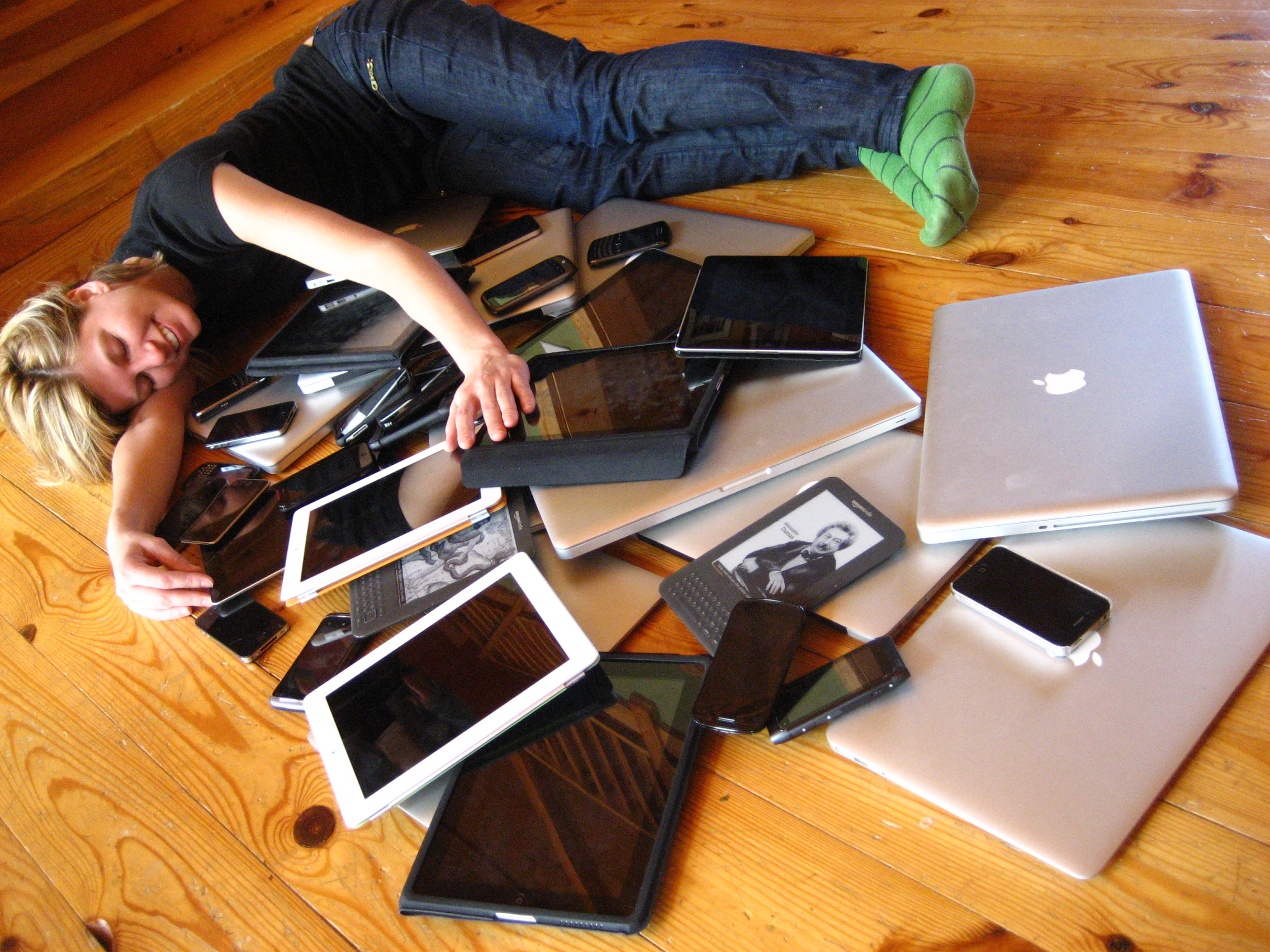
A person with many digital devices

A digital omnivore is a person who uses multiple modalities (devices) to access the Internet and other media content in their daily life. As people increasingly own mobile devices, cross-platform multimedia consumption has continued to shape the digital landscape, both in terms of the type of media content they consume and how they consume it. As of 2021, at least half of all global digital traffic is generated by mobile devices.

== Connected devices and digital consumption ==
A 2015 study of digital media consumption showed that smartphones were primarily used for communication, and tablets were primarily used for entertainment – additionally, both were frequently used in conjuncture with other devices, like televisions. An earlier 2011 analysis of the way consumers in the U.S. viewed news content on their devices throughout the day demonstrated how people use different mobile devices for different functions. On a typical weekend morning, digital omnivores accessed their news using their tablet, favored their computer during the working day, and returned to tablet use in the evening, peaking between the hours of 9 p.m. and midnight. Mobile phones were used for web-browsing throughout the day when users were away from their personal computer.

Increased Wi-Fi availability and mobile broadband adoption have changed the way people are going online. In August 2011, more than a third (37.2%) of U.S. digital traffic coming from mobile phones occurred via a Wi-Fi connection while tablets, which traditionally required a Wi-Fi connection to access the Internet, are increasingly driving traffic using mobile broadband access. As of 2021, LTE, 5G, and other forms of mobile broadband access are available on the majority of mobile devices.

Tablets contributed nearly 2% of all web browsing traffic in the United States in 2011. During this period, iPads also began to account for a higher share of Internet traffic than iPhones (46.8% vs. 42.6% of all iOS device traffic.

== Implications for marketing, advertisers and publishers ==
As of 2021, the average amount of time spent daily consuming digital media was eight hours, an increase from 2020 and a further increase from 2019, partially as a result of the COVID-19 pandemic. Social media platforms such as Instagram, Facebook, Twitter, and TikTok, as well as other online platforms like YouTube, incorporate advertisements into the in-app or online experience, with some offering the ability to shop for and sell items through the app or website.

== See also ==
- Ubiquitous computing
- Ambient intelligence
- Mobile interaction
- Pervasive game
- Wearable computer
- Internet of Things
- Mobile marketing
- New media
- Social media
- Participatory media
- Consumer-generated media
- Integrated marketing communications
- Mobile cloud computing
- Cloud computing
- Digital addict
- Digital detox
- Digital phobic
- Internet marketing
- Social-media marketing
- Marketing communications
