= Infosphere =

Sum of all knowledge on a planet

Infosphere is a metaphysical realm of information, data, knowledge, and communication, populated by informational entities called inforgs (or, informational organisms). Infosphere is portmanteau of information and -sphere.

Though one example is cyberspace, infospheres are not limited to purely online environments; they can include both offline and analogue information.

== History ==
The first documented use of the infosphere was in 1970 by Kenneth E. Boulding, who viewed it as one among the six "spheres" in his own system (the others being the sociosphere, biosphere, hydrosphere, lithosphere, and atmosphere). Boulding claimed:

[T]he infosphere...consists of inputs and outputs of conversation, books, television, radio, speeches, church services, classes, and lectures as well as information received from the physical world by personal observation.... It is clearly a segment of the sociosphere in its own right, and indeed it has considerable claim to dominate the other segments. It can be argued that development of any kind is essentially a learning process and that it is primarily dependent on a network of information flows.

In 1971, the term was used in a Time Magazine book review by R.Z. Sheppard, who wrote:

In much the way that fish cannot conceptualize water or birds the air, man barely understands his infosphere, that encircling layer of electronic and typographical smog composed of cliches from journalism, entertainment, advertising and government.

In 1980, it was used by Alvin Toffler in his book The Third Wave, in which he writes:

What is inescapably clear, whatever we choose to believe, is that we are altering our infosphere fundamentally...we are adding a whole new strata of communication to the social system. The emerging Third Wave infosphere makes that of the Second Wave era - dominated by its mass media, the post office, and the telephone - seem hopelessly primitive by contrast.

Toffler's definition proved to be prophetic, as the use of infosphere in the 1990s expanded beyond media to speculate about the common evolution of the Internet, society and culture. In his book Digital Dharma, Steven Vedro writes:

Emerging from what French philosopher-priest Pierre Teilhard de Chardin called the shared noosphere of collective human thought, invention and spiritual seeking, the Infosphere is sometimes used to conceptualize a field that engulfs our physical, mental and etheric bodies; it affects our dreaming and our cultural life. Our evolving nervous system has been extended, as media sage Marshall McLuhan predicted in the early 1960s, into a global embrace.

In 1999, the term was reinterpreted by Luciano Floridi, on the basis of biosphere, to denote the whole informational environment constituted by all informational entities (including informational agents), their properties, interactions, processes, and mutual relations. Floridi writes:

[T]he computerised description and control of the physical environment, together with the digital construction of a synthetic world, are, finally, intertwined with a fourth area of application, represented by the transformation of the encyclopadeic macrocosm of data, information, ideas, knowledge, beliefs, codified experiences, memories, images, artistic interpretations, and other mental creations into a global infosphere. The infosphere is the whole system of services and documents, encoded in any semiotic and physical media, whose contents include any sort of data, information and knowledge...with no limitations either in size, typology, or logical structure. Hence it ranges from alphanumeric texts (i.e., texts, including letters, numbers, and diacritic symbols) and multimedia products to statistical data, from films and hypertexts to whole text-banks and collections of pictures, from mathematical formulae to sounds and videoclips.

To him, it is an environment comparable to, but different from cyberspace (which is only one of its sub-regions, as it were), since it also includes offline and analogue spaces of information. According to Floridi, it is possible to equate the infosphere to the totality of Being; this equation leads him to an informational ontology.

== Manipulation of the Infosphere ==
The manipulation of the infosphere is subject to metaphysics and its rules. Information is considered to be Shannon information and is treated in a physical sense separate from energy and matter. The manipulations to the infosphere include the erasing, transfer, duplication, and destruction of information.

== Use in popular culture ==
The term was used by Dan Simmons in the science-fiction saga Hyperion (1989) to indicate what the Internet could become in the future: a place parallel, virtual, formed of billions of networks, with "artificial life" on various scales, from what is equivalent to an insect (small programs) to what is equivalent to a god (artificial intelligences), whose motivations are diverse, seeking to both help mankind and harm it.

In the animated sitcom Futurama, the Infosphere is a huge sphere floating in space, in which a species of giant, talking, floating brains attempts to store all of the information known in the universe.

The IBM Software Group created the InfoSphere brand in 2008 for its Information Management software products.

== See also ==
- Noosphere
- Semiosphere
- Ideosphere
- Simulated reality
- Umwelt
- Wikipedia
