= Digital native =

Person who has grown up in the digital age

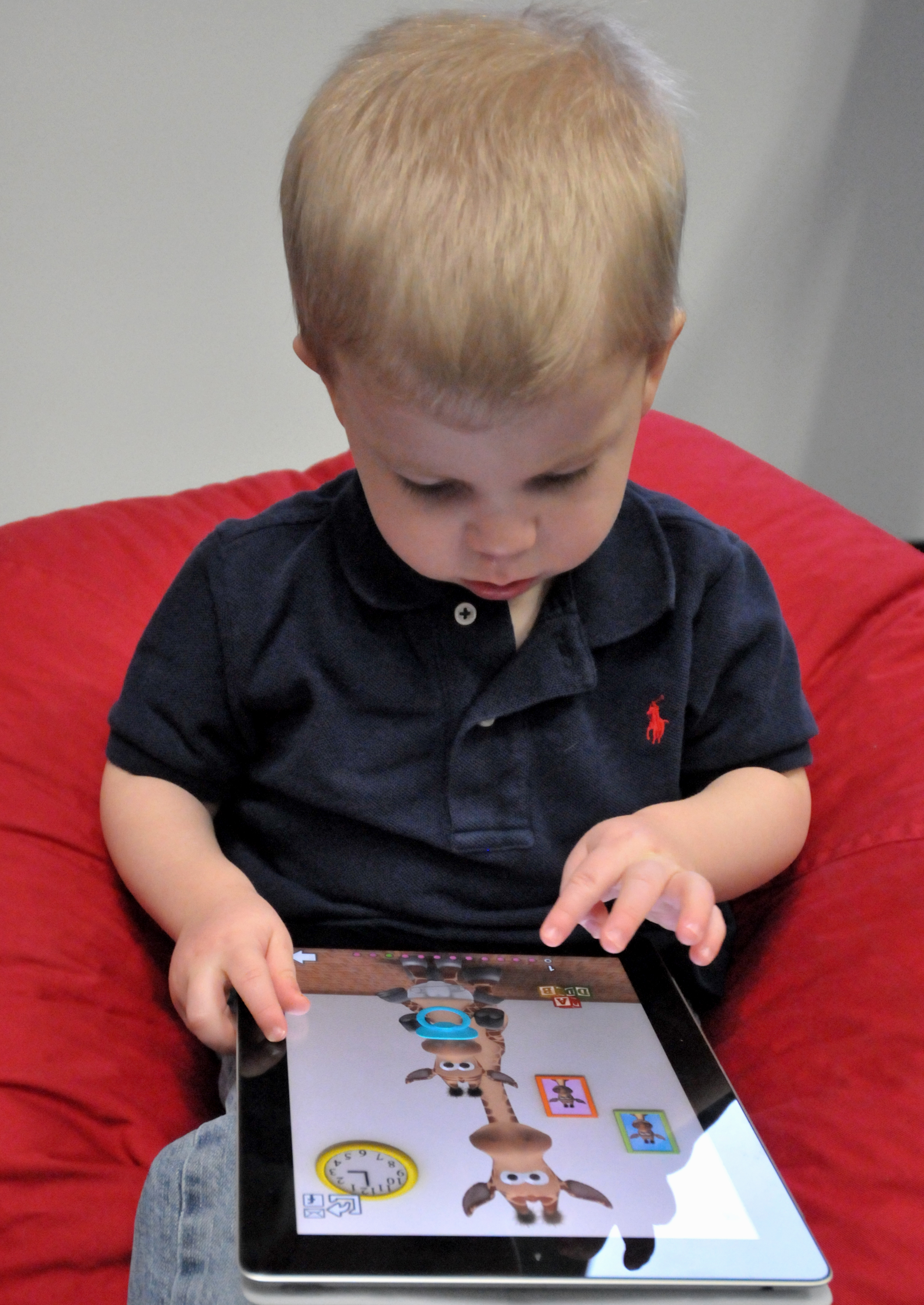
A child using a tablet, playing Talking Gina

The term digital native describes a person who has grown up in the Information Age. The term "digital native" was coined by Marc Prensky, an American writer, speaker and technologist who wrote several articles referencing this subject. This term was specifically applied to the generation that grew up in the "digital age", predominantly regarding individuals born from 1981 onwards, namely Millennials, Generation Z, and Generation Alpha. It proposes that individuals from these demographic cohorts can quickly and comfortably locate, consume and send digital information through electronic devices and platforms such as computers, mobile phones, and social media.

The ideas underlying the term "digital natives" says that they are distinguished from digital immigrants, people who grew up in a world dominated by print and television, because they were born before the advent of the Internet. Supposedly, the digital generation grew up with increased confidence in the technology that they were encircled and in which they were engulfed. Proponents of this term believe that this occurred in part because of their predecessors growing interest in a subject that was previously unknown and that, due to their upbringing, this digital generation of youth became fixated on their technologies as it became an ingrained, integral and essential way of life. Prensky concluded that due to the volume of daily interactions with technology, the digital native generation had developed a completely different way of thinking. They further believe that though the brains of these youths may not have changed physically, pathways and thinking patterns had evolved and their brains had changed to be physiologically different than those of the bygone era. Repeated exposure had helped grow and stimulate certain regions of the brain, while other unused parts of the brain were reduced in size.

The terms digital native and digital immigrant are often used to describe the digital generation gap in terms of the ability of technological use among people born after 1980 and those born before. The term digital native is a highly contested concept, being considered by many education researchers as a persistent myth not founded on empirical evidence, and many argue for a more nuanced approach in understanding the relationship between digital media, learning and youth.

== Origin ==
Native–immigrant analogy terms, referring to age groups' relationships with and understanding of the Internet, were used as early as 1995 by John Perry Barlow in an interview, and used again in 1996 as part of the Declaration of the Independence of Cyberspace.

The specific terms digital native and digital immigrant were popularized by education consultant Marc Prensky in his 2001 article entitled Digital Natives, Digital Immigrants, in which he relates the contemporary decline in American education to educators' failure to understand the needs of modern students. His article posited that "the arrival and rapid dissemination of digital technology in the last decade of the 20th century" had changed the way students think and process information, making it difficult for them to excel academically using the outdated teaching methods of the day. In other words, children raised in a digital, media-saturated world, require a media-rich learning environment to hold their attention, and Prensky dubbed these children "digital natives". He also goes on to say that digital natives have "spent their entire lives surrounded by and using computers and videogames, digital music players, videocams, cell phones and all other toys and tools of the digital age".

Globally, 30 percent of the population born between 1988 and 1998 had used the Internet for over five years as of 2013.

== Conceptualization and development ==
Digital Natives, Digital Immigrants Marc Prensky defines the term "digital native" and applies it to a new group of students enrolling in educational establishments referring to the young generation as "native speakers" of the digital language of computers, videos, video games, social media and other sites on the internet. Contextually, his ideas were introduced after a decade of worry over increased diagnosis of children with ADD and ADHD, which itself turned out to be largely overblown. Prensky did not strictly define the digital native in his 2001 article, but it was later, arbitrarily, applied to children born after 1980, because computer bulletin board systems and Usenet were already in use at the time.

The idea became popular among educators and parents whose children fell within Prensky's definition of a digital native, and has since been embraced as an effective marketing tool. Prensky's original paper was not a scientific one, and that no empirical data exists to support his claims. However, the concept has been widely addressed in the academic literature since, mainly in education research, but also in health research. A review published in 2024 found nearly 1,900 academic articles to have used the term digital native since the mid-2000s, noting how the meaning of the term had evolved to cover everything from businesses and start-ups to new generations of "AI natives".

Prensky has since abandoned his digital native metaphor in favor of "digital wisdom". The Digital Visitor and Resident idea has been proposed as one alternative to understanding the various ways individuals engage with digital technology. It is also argued that digital native and digital immigrant are labels that oversimplify the classification scheme and that there are categories that can be considered "undetermined" based from the framework of the previous assignations.

The critique of Prensky's conceptualization has resulted in further refinement of the terms. For instance, digital natives have been further classified into three types: the avoiders, minimalists, and enthusiastic participants. The avoiders are those who do not depend on technological devices and use technology minimally while the minimalists make use of the trends, although not as often as the enthusiastic participants.

People who were "born digital" first appeared in a series of presentations by Josh Spear beginning in May 2007. A Digital Native research project was run jointly by the Berkman Center for Internet & Society at Harvard Law School and the Research Center for Information Law at the University of St. Gallen in Switzerland. A collaborative research project was run by Hivos, Netherlands and the Bangalore-based Centre for Internet and Society. The Net Generation Encountering eLearning at University Project funded by Research Councils UK was completed in March 2010. The digital Museum of Social Media, launched in 2012 by the Wiley Online Library, included an exhibition about "Digital Natives & Friends".

== Conflicts between generations ==
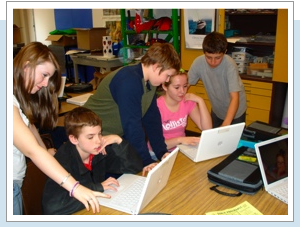
Schoolchildren working with laptop computers

The generational changes between digital natives, and their predecessors, the digital immigrant, have been astronomical. According to a study conducted by Tapscott, after interviewing and studying 11,000 young digital natives, he was able to determine eight different social norms between digital natives and the digital immigrants before them. Digital natives were offered the freedom, creativity to customize and ability to scrutinize, unlike their predecessors. For this generation, digital natives prioritized corporate integrity and openness when it was time for them to choose a career. These digital natives also began to seek entertaining and innovating career choices. Corporate integrity and openness also applied to consumer products, with digital natives more likely to choose products recommended by their friends. With playful mentalities, this new generation also brought with them a "need for speed". The eight social norms differentiated these digital natives, as well as the development of the need for approval from their peer groups.

Because many digital immigrants are used to a life without digital technology or may be hesitant to adapt to it, they can sometimes be at variance with digital natives in their view of it. The everyday regimen of work-life is becoming more technologically dependent with advancements such as computers in offices, improved telecommunication, and more complex machinery in industry. This can make it difficult for digital immigrants to keep pace, which has the potential to create conflict between older supervisors and managers and an increasingly younger workforce. Similarly, parents of digital natives clash with their children at home over gaming, texting, YouTube, Facebook and other Internet technology issues. Much of the world's Millennials and Generation Z members are digital natives. According to law professor and educator John Palfrey, there may be substantial differences between digital natives and non digital natives, in terms of how people see relationships and institutions and how they access information. In spite of this, the timetable for training young and old on new technology is about the same.

Prensky states that education is the single largest problem facing the digital world as digital immigrant instructors, who speak an outdated language (that of the pre-digital age), are struggling to teach a population that speaks an entirely new language. Digital natives have had an increased exposure to technology, which has changed the way they interact and respond to digital devices. In order to meet the unique learning needs of digital natives, teachers need to move away from traditional teaching methods that are disconnected with the way students now learn. For the last 20 years, technology training for teachers has been at the forefront of policy. However, immigrants suffer complications in teaching natives how to understand an environment which is "native" to them and foreign to immigrants. Teachers not only struggle with proficiency levels and their abilities to integrate technology into the classroom, but also, display resistance towards the integration of digital tools. Since technology can be frustrating and complicated at times, some teachers worry about maintaining their level or professionalism within the classroom. Teachers worry about appearing "unprofessional" in front of their students. Although technology presents challenges in the classroom, it is still very important for teachers to understand how natural and useful these digital tools are for students.

To meet the unique learning needs of digital natives, Forzani and Leu suggest that digital tools are able to respond immediately to the natural, exploratory, and interactive learning style of students today. Learning how to use these digital tools not only provides unique learning opportunities for digital natives, but they also provide necessary skills that will define their future success in the digital age. One preference to this problem is to invent computer games to teach digital natives the lessons they need to learn, no matter how serious. This ideology has already been introduced to a number of serious practicalities. For example, piloting an unmanned aerial vehicle (UAV) in the army consists of someone sitting in front of a computer screen issuing commands to the UAV via a hand-held controller which resembles, in detail, the model of controllers that are used to play games on an Xbox 360 game console. (Jodie C Spreadbury, Army Recruiting and Training Division).

Gamification as a teaching tool has sparked interest in education, and Gee suggests this is because games have special properties that books cannot offer for digital natives. For instance, gamification provides an interactive environment for students to engage and practice 21st century skills such as collaboration, critical thinking, problem solving, and digital literacy. Gee presents four reasons why gamification provides a distinct way of learning to promote 21st century skills. First, games are based on problem solving and not on ones ability to memorize content knowledge. Second, gamification promotes creativity in digital natives where they are encouraged to think like a designer or modify to redesign games. Third, digital natives are beginning to co-author their games through the choices they make to solve problems and face challenges. Therefore, students' thinking is stimulated to promote metacognition since they have to think about their choices and how they will alter the course and outcome of the game. Lastly, through online gaming, digital natives are able to collaborate and learn in a more social environment. Positive effects from gaming have been seen, one effect is expanding social relationships either preexisting or forming new social bonds. Based on the literature, one can see the potential and unique benefits digital tools have. For example, online games help digital natives meet their unique learning needs. Furthermore, online gaming seems to provide an interactive and engaging environment that promotes the necessary skills digital natives will need to be successful in their future.

== Implication of technological and media landscapes ==
Digital natives vary in demographic based on their region's technological and media landscapes. Not everyone agrees with the language and underlying connotations of the digital native. The term, by definition, makes the assumption that all digital natives have the same base familiarity with technology. Similarly, the term digital immigrants implies that this entire age group struggles with technological advancements. For instance, those on the disadvantaged side of the digital divide lack access to technology. In its application, the concept of the digital native preferences those who grow up with technology as having a special status, ignoring the significant difference between familiarity and creative application.

Digital natives are determined based on their educational and cultural backgrounds as well as their access to technology. As the adoption of digital technology hasn't been a unified phenomenon worldwide, digital natives are not all in the same age group. Self-perception also plays a role: individuals who do not feel confident in their use of technology will not be considered a native regardless of the formally mentioned factors.

References to some generations using terms such as "digital natives" are made because these groups can create their own culture and characteristics. Some of the cultural traits and characteristics of digital natives include, according to self-description:

1. They feel familiar with digital devices. 54% of them have a smartphone as their first personal mobile phone. These devices are used for entertainment and as a requirement in educational endeavours.
2. They tend to be individualistic.
3. They can multitask or focus on a single medium when needed.
4. They are realistic. Raised in affluence, digital natives think their future is unclear due to the prolonged economic recession and the Fourth Industrial Revolution. This kind of thinking makes them focus more on their reality.

== Teaching digital natives ==
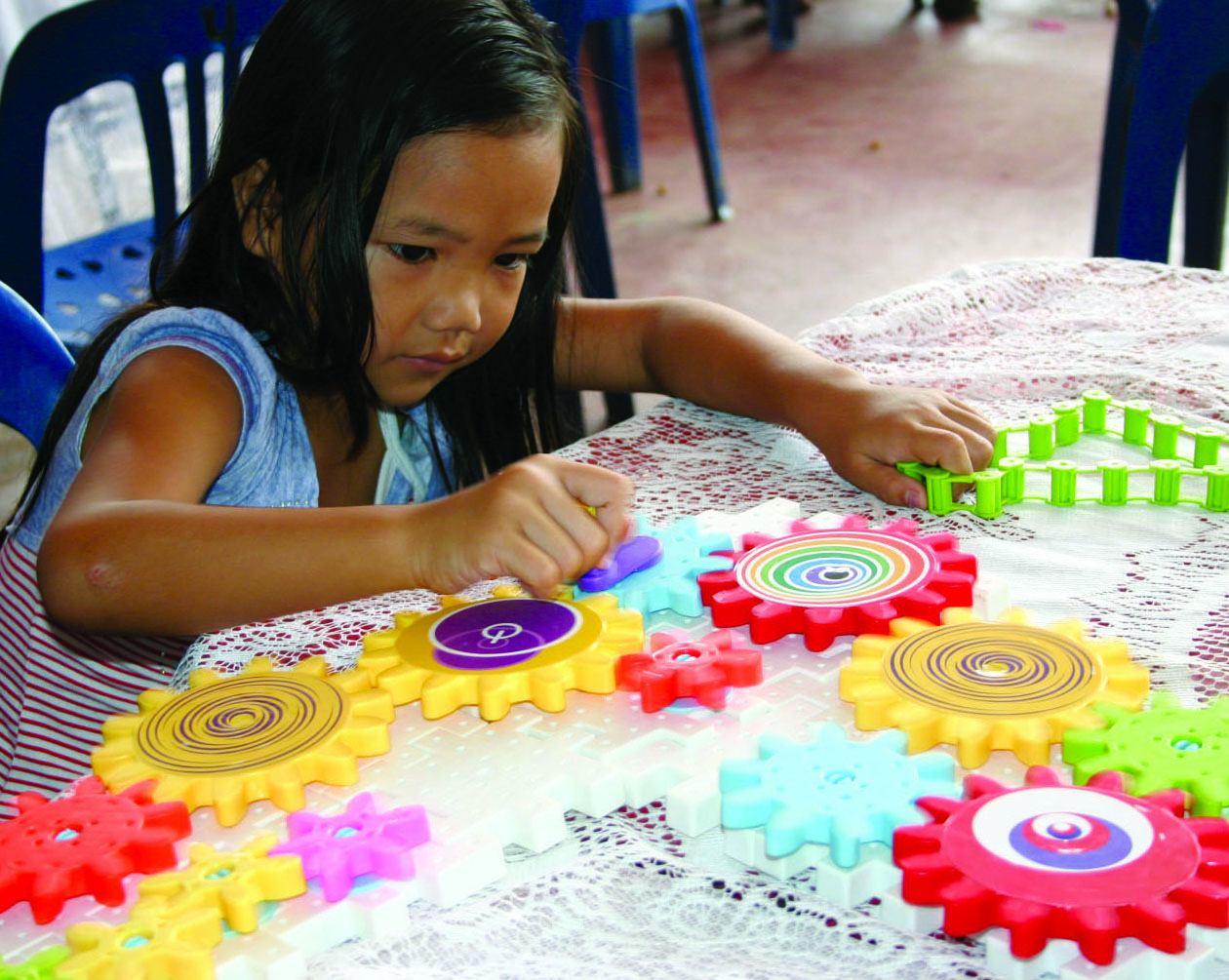
Young girl learning how gears work with the use of a toy

Prensky states that as digital natives grew up in the age of technology, they embraced new ways to gather information and communicate. This can be through social media, or through different computer programs. Digital natives have become comfortable with the use of technology, often possessing different levels of digital literacy. This does not mean all digital natives possess the same skill level or know how to use proper digital literacy. Digital natives developed these skills through the use of computers, phones, social media, research, etc. outside of formal education.

Technology being a part of and introduced to classrooms meets the needs of digital natives. Educational technology in schools does not mean removing human relationships, as teacher-student relationships are essential to learning. Digital natives tend to be "masters" of multitasking; the ability to access and process large amounts of information at a time can allow digital natives to jump from one task to another or in parallel. There is a noted preference for visual and graphic learning rather than plain text. Concentration and attentiveness differs among digital natives compared to their predecessors; use of technology in the classroom increases student interactivity, and visuals such as slide shows allow for educators to share information easily while increasing student attentiveness. Digital natives must be interested in what they are learning; interactivity is important to aid in engagement, application of learned material, and in learning to connect various pieces of knowledge to each other. Applying skills, whether it be in a game, program, creating a blog, etc., provides digital natives with first-hand experiences of events, observations, and manipulation of natural processes. Digital natives like to be challenged in what they are learning as it is an opportunity to discover new information. Further learning is stimulated by the desire to know more and exploration of new information. This type of engagement gives natives a chance to be creative, to explore, research, and increases their ability to explain, elaborate, and evaluate what they have done in a meaningful way.

== Age discrimination in recruitment ==
The popular adoption of the term "digital native" has caused concern to equality campaigners in various countries, including the United States and the UK, where the term has been used as a process for selection in recruitment. This has resulted in a number of successful legal claims.

=== United States ===
In 2017, in the United States, evidence was provided to the Equal Employment Opportunity Commission that a test case needed to come before the courts to consider the lawfulness of recruiting for "digital natives". In January 2018, Maurice Anscombe, Lura Callahan, and the Communication Workers of America filed complaints with the Equal Employment Opportunity Commission, claiming that the Target Corporation published job ads on a social media platform in 2017 that were directed to younger workers within certain age ranges only, and not to older workers. On 17 May 2023, in a voluntary agreement announced in a press release issued by AARP, the corporation confirmed that they would not exclude applicants based on "adjectives that describe people in relation to their age (such as "millennial" or "digital native")."

=== Germany ===
On 18 January 2024, a 51-year-old in Germany brought a case in the ArbG Heilbronn 8th Chamber which ruled that the wording "digital native" in the job advertisement discriminated against them on the grounds of age and violated the prohibition set forth in Section 7 of the Equal Treatment Act (AGG), Germany's law created as a result of the Equality Directive 2000.

=== United Kingdom ===
In late 2024 and early 2025, a 54-year-old in the United Kingdom, Paul Shuttleworth, claimed to have been rejected from roles within the Civil Service, in which the job applications had requested "digital natives" and "social media natives". Shuttleworth raised complaints about these applications on the basis of ageism, and threatened to escalate the matter to a judicial review in the UK courts, in order to force the British government to stop using the terms. The Daily Telegraph reported in January 2025 that human resources directors in the Cabinet Office had been instructed to no longer use the terms, as of August 2024.

== See also ==
- Digital addict
- Digital phobic
- Homo Ludens
- Information Age
- Information society
- Internet age
- Millennial pause
- Online identity
- Social Age
- Thumb tribe

== Notes ==
- New Millennium Learners. Initial findings on the effects of digital technologies on school-age learners (PDF). OECD/CERI International Conference "Learning in the 21st Century: Research, Innovation and Policy" 15–16 May 2008 Paris. 2008.
- Paul Maunders (4 November 2007). "Public email to army about Xbox UAVs: Army fly UAV Spy Plane with Xbox 360 Controller | Paul Maunders | Web log". Pyrosoft.co.uk. Archived from the original on 16 December 2013.
- Shah Nishant and Sunil Abraham, Digital Natives with a Cause? (2009) available online
- White, David S.; Le Cornu, Alison (23 August 2011). "Visitors and Residents: A new typology for online engagement". First Monday. doi:10.5210/fm.v16i9.3171. hdl:10818/12424.
- Rojas, Viviana. "Communities, Cultural Capital and the Digital Divide" Media Access: Social and Psychological Dimensions of New Technology Use. Mahwah: Lawrence Erlbaum Associates.
- Jenkins, Henry (4 December 2007). "Reconsidering Digital Immigrants".
- Forzani, Elena; Leu, Donald J. (October 2012). "New Literacies for New Learners: The Need for Digital Technologies in Primary Classrooms". The Educational Forum. 76 (4): 421–424. doi:10.1080/00131725.2012.708623. S2CID 143840579.
- Hicks, Stephanie Diamond (August 2011). "Technology in Today's Classroom: Are You a Tech-Savvy Teacher?". The Clearing House: A Journal of Educational Strategies, Issues and Ideas. 84 (5): 188–191. doi:10.1080/00098655.2011.557406. S2CID 142593701.
- Morgan, Hani (1 March 2014). "Using Digital Story Projects to Help Students Improve in Reading and Writing". Reading Improvement. 51 (1): 20–26.
- Morgan, Hani (January 2014). "Maximizing Student Success with Differentiated Learning". The Clearing House: A Journal of Educational Strategies, Issues and Ideas. 87 (1): 34–38. doi:10.1080/00098655.2013.832130. S2CID 143716585.
- Parker, J; Lazaros, E J (2014). "Teaching 21st century skills and STEM concepts in the elementary classroom". Children's Technology and Engineering. 8 (4): 24–27.
