= Cyberia (book) =

1994 book by Douglas Rushkoff

- Author: Douglas Rushkoff
- Publisher: HarperOne
- Publication date: 1994

Cyberia is a book by Douglas Rushkoff, published in 1994. The book discusses many different ideas revolving around technology, drugs and subcultures. Rushkoff takes a Tom Wolfe Electric Kool-Aid Acid Test style (or roman à clef), as he actively becomes a part of the people and culture that he is writing about. The book goes with Rushkoff as he discusses topics ranging from online culture, the concept of a global brain as put forth in Gaia theory, and Neoshamanism.

In the preface of the 1994 edition, Rushkoff describes his book as "about a very special moment in our recent history – a moment when anything seemed possible. When an entire subculture – like a kid at a rave trying virtual reality for the first time – saw the wild potentials of marrying the latest computer technologies with the most intimately held dreams and the most ancient spiritual truths. It is a moment that predates America Online, twenty million Internet subscribers, Wired magazine, Bill Clinton, and the information superhighway. But it is a moment that foresaw a whole lot more".

The book, with its introduction titled "Surfing the Learning Curve of Sisyphus," captures a pivotal moment in history when endless possibilities emerged. It delves into the lives and experiences of individuals who recognized the impending cultural shift into uncharted territory. People mentioned include: Craig Neidorf, Ralph Abraham, John Barlow, Dan Kottke, David Gans, Jaron Lanier, Bruce Eisner, Fraser Clark, Mitch Kapor, Phiber Optik, Howard Rheingold, R. U. Sirius, Terence McKenna, John Draper, Neysa "Earth Girl" Griffith, Genesis P-Orridge and Timothy Leary.

Rather than offering a comprehensive analysis of the entire cyber landscape, the book provides a guided exploration of select areas within this nascent culture, to which the author gained privileged access. The work is organized into five sections: "Computers: Revenge of the Nerds," "Drugs: The Substances of Designer Reality," "Technoshamanism: The Transition Team," "Cut and Paste: Artists in Cyberia," and "Warfare in Cyberia: Ways and Memes."

Rushkoff's first book was originally penned in 1992 but was not published until 1994 due to publisher concerns that electronic mail and the Internet were still obscure topics unlikely to gain traction. In Cyberia, Rushkoff emphasizes a "cyberian counterculture" out to redefine reality, where people begin to comprehend the systemic, cultural, and spiritual implications afforded by building a technological civilization. Armed with new technologies, familiar with cyberspace, and daring enough to explore unmapped realms of consciousness, his efforts in Cyberia represent the Promethean spirit intrinsic to countercultures throughout the ages.
