= Ideosphere =

The ideosphere—like the noosphere (i.e., the realm of reason)—is the metaphysical 'place' where thoughts, theories, ideas, and ideation are regarded to be created, evaluated, and evolved.

Analogous to the biosphere (the realm of biological evolution), the ideosphere is the realm of memetic evolution, where 'memes' take the role of biological genes. As such, the ideosphere is an entire memetic ecology: the collective intelligence of all humans wherein memes live, reproduce, compete, and mutate.

The health of an ideosphere, in this sense, can be measured by its memetic diversity. Moreover, like the biosphere, it has ecological niches, which serve as environments for groups or audiences. For instance, some entities compete for ecological niches in the ideosphere, such as Buddha, Laozi, the kami of Shinto, Satan, Jesus Christ in Christianity and in other religions, etc. Another example, an ideosphere is formed around a linguistic system that involves a mixture of cynicism and sentimentality as well as the violent appropriation of the other's word.

Douglas Hofstadter and Aaron Lynch are considered to have independently co-invented the term ideosphere in the mid-1980s.

The ideosphere is not considered to be a physical place by most people; instead, it is "inside the minds" of all the humans in the world. It is also sometimes believed that the Internet, books, and other media could be considered to be part of the ideosphere—however such media lack the ability to process the thoughts they contain.

According to philosopher Yasuhiko Kimura, the ideosphere is "concentric" in form, as ideas are generated by a few people with others merely perceiving and accepting these ideas from these "external authorities." He advocates an "omnicentric" configuration, wherein all individuals create new ideas and interact as self-authorities. There is the notion that most of humanity remains the consumer instead of producer of ideas. To address this, Kimura proposed the so-called ideospheric transformation, triggered by a synergetic phenomenon produced by the emergence of a sufficient number of authentic and independent thinkers.

== See also ==
- Anthroposphere (aka technosphere)
  - Cyberspace
    - Blogosphere
    - Twittersphere
  - Infosphere
  - Logosphere
  - Noosphere
- Biosphere
- Semiosphere
- Meme
  - Memetics
- Sociocultural evolution
- Collective unconscious
