= Marc Prensky =

American author and speaker (1946–2025)

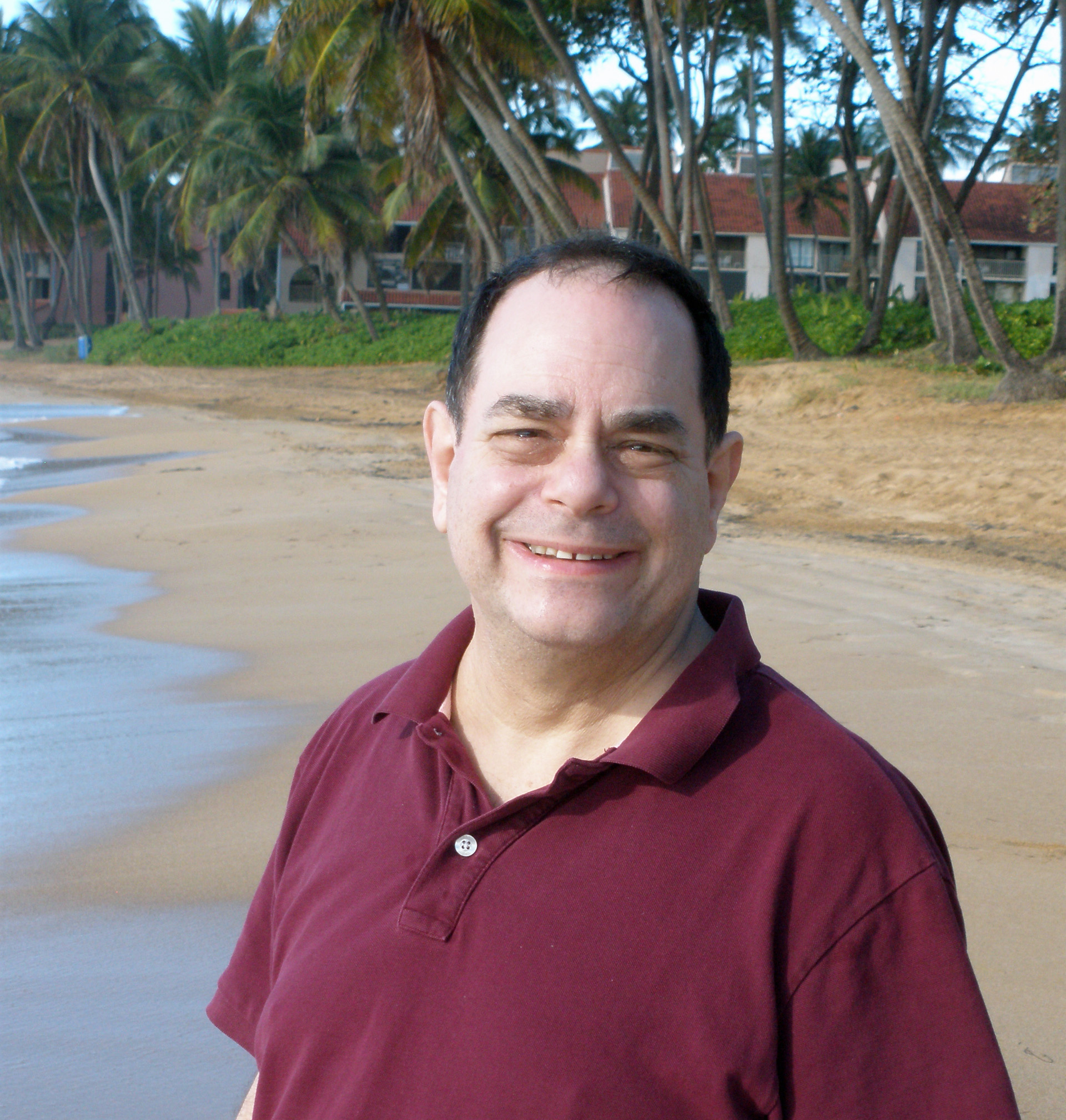
- Prensky in 2011
- Born: March 15, 1946; New York City, U.S.
- Died: May 15, 2025 (aged 79); Palo Alto, California, U.S.
- Education: Oberlin College; Yale University; Harvard Business School
- Occupations: Author, speaker

Marc Prensky (March 15, 1946 – May 15, 2025) was an American writer and speaker on education. He was best known as the creator of the terms "digital native" and "digital immigrant" which he described in a 2001 article in On the Horizon.

Prensky held degrees from Oberlin College (1966), Middlebury College (MA, 1967), Yale University (1968) and the Harvard Business School (1980). He was the author of seven books: Digital Game-Based Learning (McGraw-Hill 2001), Don't Bother Me Mom – I'm Learning (Paragon House 2006), Teaching Digital Natives (Corwin Press 2010), From Digital Natives to Digital Wisdom: Hopeful Essays for 21st Century Learning (2012), Brain Gain: Technology and the Quest for Digital Wisdom (2012), The World Needs a New Curriculum (The Global Future Education Foundation, 2014), Education To Better Their World: Unleashing the power of 21st century kids (Teachers College Press, 2016) and 100 essays on learning and education. Prensky also designed the first first-person-shooter game for corporate training (Straight Shooter, 1987) and a suite of eight learning game templates (For Corporate Gameware in 1996).

Prensky began his career as a teacher in Harlem, New York. He has taught in elementary school, (New Haven, Connecticut), high school (New York, New York), and college (Wagner College, Staten Island, New York) and in the mid-1970s he also earned money playing his lute in a classical music restaurant/bar. He worked for six years (1981–1987) as a corporate strategist and product development director with the Boston Consulting Group, and six years (1993–1999) for Bankers Trust on Wall St., where he created game-based training for financial traders, and started an internal division, Corporate Gameware, later spun out as games2train.

Prensky died from pancreatic cancer on May 15, 2025, at the age of 79.

== Focus and research ==
Prensky's professional focus was on K-12 education reform. His books address tools (Digital Game-Based Learning), pedagogy (Teaching Digital Natives), curriculum (The World Needs a New Curriculum) and the entire k-12 system (Education to Better Their World).

Prensky was a strong advocate for listening more carefully to what students say about their own education. In his speaking engagements he has conducted approximately 100 student panels in 40 countries.

He has been named a "guiding star of the new parenting movement" by Parental Intelligence Newsletter.

== Criticism ==
Bax (2011) has written that Prensky's views are simplistic, that his terminology is open to challenge and that his claim that educators should simply alter their approach to suit young people who are 'digital natives' ignores essential elements of the nature of learning and good pedagogy. The Economist (2010) questioned whether the designation of the 'digital native' has any real-world usefulness.

Prensky responded that: "The distinction between digital natives and digital immigrants is important because it is more cultural than technology-knowledge-based. ‘Digital Immigrants’ grew up in a non-digital, pre-Internet culture before they experienced the digital one. 'Digital Natives' know only the digital culture." Prensky further argued that "the fields of education and pedagogy have today become needlessly and painfully over-complicated, ignoring our students' (and our world’s) real needs. It is time to reassess what good and effective teaching means in a digital age and how to combine what is important from the past with the tools of the future." Prensky argued that "despite recent influxes of technology into schools, not enough attention is being paid to the full implications of all the important recent changes in our educational environment and context".

== Books ==
Prensky's books include:-

- Digital Game-Based Learning
- Don't Bother Me Mom — I'm Learning
- Teaching Digital Natives — Partnering for Real Learning
- From Digital Natives to Digital Wisdom: Hopeful Essays for 21st Century Learning
- Brain Gain: Technology and the Quest for Digital Wisdom
- The World Needs a New Curriculum
- Education To Better Their World: Unleashing the Power of 21st Century Kids

== Volumes edited ==
- Games and Simulation in Online Learning (with Gibson)
