= IBM InfoSphere DataStage =

ETL tool

- Original author: Lee Scheffler
- Stable release: 11.x
- Platform: ETL Tool
- Type: Data integration
- Website: http://www.ibm.com

IBM InfoSphere DataStage is an ETL tool and part of the IBM Information Platforms Solutions suite and IBM InfoSphere. It uses a graphical notation to construct data integration solutions and is available in various versions such as the Server Edition, the Enterprise Edition, and the MVS Edition. It uses a client-server architecture. The servers can be deployed in both Unix as well as Windows.

It is a powerful data integration tool, frequently used in Data Warehousing projects to prepare the data for the generation of reports.

== History ==
DataStage originated at VMark Software Inc, a company that developed two notable products: UniVerse database and the DataStage ETL tool. The first VMark ETL prototype was built by Lee Scheffler in the first half of 1996. Peter Weyman was VMark VP of Strategy and identified the ETL market as an opportunity. He appointed Lee Scheffler as the architect and conceived the product brand name "Stage" to signify modularity and component-orientation. This tag was used to name DataStage and subsequently used in related products QualityStage, ProfileStage, MetaStage and AuditStage. Lee Scheffler presented the DataStage product overview to the board of VMark in June 1996 and it was approved for development. The product was in alpha testing in October, beta testing in November and was generally available in January 1997.

VMARK and Unidata merged in October 1997 and renamed themselves to Ardent Software. In 1999 Ardent Software was acquired by Informix the database software vendor. In April 2001 IBM acquired Informix and took just the database business leaving the data integration tools to be spun off as an independent software company called Ascential Software. In November 2001, Ascential Software Corp. of Westboro, Mass. acquired privately held Torrent Systems Inc. of Cambridge, Massachusetts for $46 million in cash. Ascential announced a commitment to integrate Orchestrate's parallel processing capabilities directly into the DataStageXE platform. In March 2005 IBM acquired Ascential Software and made DataStage part of the WebSphere family as WebSphere DataStage. In 2006 the product was released as part of the IBM Information Server under the Information Management family but was still known as WebSphere DataStage. In 2008 the suite was renamed to InfoSphere Information Server and the product was renamed to InfoSphere DataStage.

== Releases ==
- Enterprise Edition (PX): a name given to the version of DataStage that had a parallel processing architecture and parallel ETL jobs.
- Server Edition: the name of the original version of DataStage representing Server Jobs. Early DataStage versions only contained Server Jobs. DataStage 5 added Sequence Jobs and DataStage 6 added Parallel Jobs via Enterprise Edition.
- MVS Edition: mainframe jobs, developed on a Windows or Unix/Linux platform and transferred to the mainframe as compiled mainframe jobs.
- DataStage for PeopleSoft: a server edition with prebuilt PeopleSoft EPM jobs under an OEM arrangement with PeopleSoft and Oracle Corporation.
- DataStage TX: for processing complex transactions and messages, formerly known as "Mercator". Now known as IBM Transformation Extender.
- ISD (Information Services Director, ex. DataStage RTI): Real Time Integration pack can turn server or parallel jobs into SOA services.

== IBM Acquisition ==
InfoSphere DataStage is a data integration tool. It was acquired by IBM in 2005 and has become a part of IBM Information Server Platform. It uses a client/server design where jobs are created and administered via a Windows client against central repository on a server. The IBM InfoSphere DataStage is capable of integrating data on demand across multiple and high volumes of data sources and target applications using a high performance parallel framework. InfoSphere DataStage also facilitates extended metadata management and enterprise connectivity
