= Noosphere =

Philosophical concept of biosphere successor via humankind's rational activities

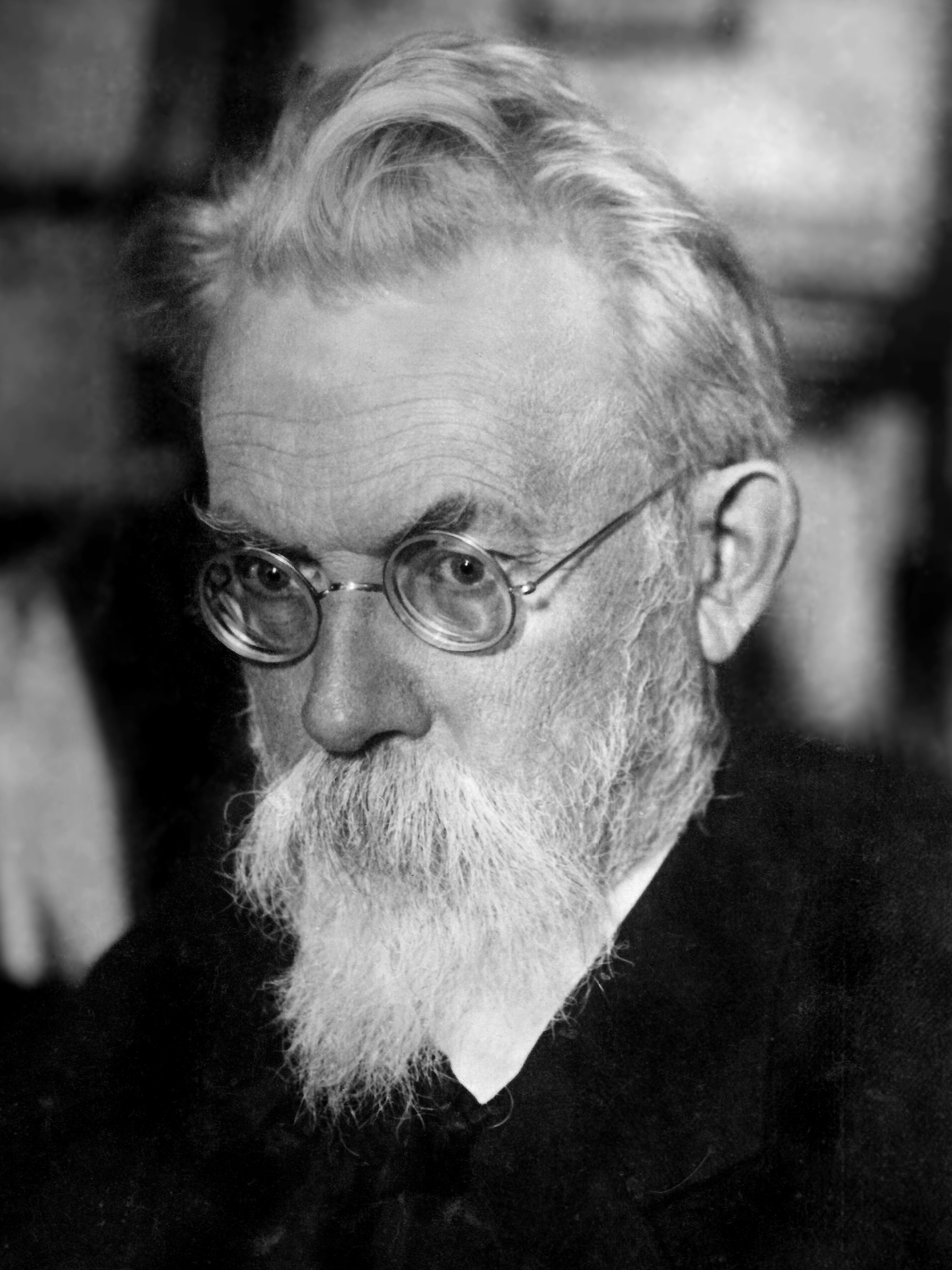
Vladimir Vernadsky, 1934

The noosphere (also spelled noösphere; IPA: /ˈnoʊ.əsfɪɚ/; NOH-ə-sfeer) is a philosophical concept developed and popularized by the biogeochemist Vladimir Vernadsky and philosopher and Jesuit priest Pierre Teilhard de Chardin. Vernadsky defined the noosphere as the new state of the biosphere, and described it as the planetary "sphere of reason". The noosphere represents the highest stage of biospheric development, that of humankind's rational activities.

The word is derived from the Greek νόος ("nous, mind, reason") and σφαῖρα ("sphere"), in lexical analogy to "atmosphere" and "biosphere". The concept cannot be accredited to a single author. The founding authors Vernadsky and de Chardin developed two related but starkly different concepts, the former grounded in the geological sciences, and the latter in theology. Both conceptions of the noosphere share the common thesis that together human reason and scientific thought have created, and will continue to create, the next evolutionary geological layer. This geological layer is part of the evolutionary chain. Second-generation authors, predominantly of Russian origin, have further developed the Vernadskian concept, creating the related concepts: noocenosis and noocenology.

== Concept ==
In the theory of Vernadsky, the noosphere is the third in a succession of phases of development of the Earth, after the geosphere (inanimate matter) and the biosphere (biological life). Just as the emergence of life fundamentally transformed the geosphere, the emergence of human cognition fundamentally transforms the biosphere. In contrast to the conceptions of the Gaia theorists, or the promoters of cyberspace, Vernadsky's noosphere emerges at the point where humankind, through the mastery of nuclear processes, begins to create resources through the transmutation of elements. It is a study area of the Global Consciousness Project.

For de Chardin, the noosphere emerges through and is constituted by the interaction of human minds. The noosphere has grown in step with the organization of the human mass in relation to itself as it populates the Earth. As mankind organizes itself in more complex social networks, the higher the noosphere will grow in awareness. This concept extends Teilhard's Law of Complexity/Consciousness, the law describing the nature of evolution in the universe. Teilhard argued the noosphere is growing towards an even greater integration and unification, culminating in the Omega Point - an apex of thought/consciousness - which he saw as the goal of history.

== Founding authors ==
The term noosphere was first used in the publications of Pierre Teilhard de Chardin in 1922 in his Cosmogenesis. Vernadsky was most likely introduced to the term by a common acquaintance, Édouard Le Roy, during a stay in Paris. Some sources claim Édouard Le Roy actually first proposed the term. Vernadsky himself wrote that he was first introduced to the concept by Le Roy in his 1927 lectures at the College of France, and that Le Roy had emphasized a mutual exploration of the concept with Teilhard de Chardin. According to Vernadsky's own letters, he took Le Roy's ideas on the noosphere from Le Roy's article "Les origines humaines et l’évolution de l’intelligence", part III: "La noosphère et l’hominisation", before reworking the concept within his own field, biogeochemistry. The historian Bailes concludes that Vernadsky and Teilhard de Chardin were mutual influences on each other, as Teilhard de Chardin also attended Vernadsky's lectures on biogeochemistry, before creating the concept of the noosphere.

An account stated that Le Roy and Teilhard were not aware of the concept of biosphere in their noosphere concept and that it was Vernadsky who introduced them to this notion, which gave their conceptualization a grounding on natural sciences. Both Teilhard de Chardin and Vernadsky base their conceptions of the noosphere on the term 'biosphere', developed by Eduard Suess in 1875. Despite the differing backgrounds, approaches and focuses of Teilhard and Vernadsky, they have a few fundamental themes in common. Both scientists overstepped the boundaries of the natural sciences and attempted to create all-embracing theoretical constructions founded in philosophy, the social sciences and authorized interpretations of the evolutionary theory. Moreover, both thinkers were convinced of the teleological character of evolution. They also argued that human activity becomes a geological power and that the manner by which it is directed can influence the environment. There are fundamental differences in the two conceptions.

== See also ==
- Anthropocene
- Anthropogenic metabolism
- Anthroposphere (technosphere)
- Collective consciousness
- Culture of health
- Global brain
- Global Consciousness Project
- Human ecology
- Hylozoism
- Ideosphere
- Knowledge ecosystem
- Nous
- Presence (telepresence)
- Scale (analytical tool)
- Social organism
- Technoetics
- World Brain
