= Value sensitive design =

Design method that accounts for human values

Value sensitive design (VSD) is a theoretically grounded approach to the design of technology that accounts for human values in a principled and comprehensive manner. VSD originated within the field of information systems design and human-computer interaction to address design issues within the fields by emphasizing the ethical values of direct and indirect stakeholders. It was developed by Batya Friedman and Peter Kahn at the University of Washington starting in the late 1980s and early 1990s. Later, in 2019, Batya Friedman and David Hendry wrote a book on this topic called "Value Sensitive Design: Shaping Technology with Moral Imagination". Value Sensitive Design takes human values into account in a well-defined matter throughout the whole process. Designs are developed using an investigation consisting of three phases: conceptual, empirical and technological. These investigations are intended to be iterative, allowing the designer to modify the design continuously.

The VSD approach is often described as an approach that is fundamentally predicated on its ability to be modified depending on the technology, value(s), or context of use. Some examples of modified VSD approaches are Privacy by Design which is concerned with respecting the privacy of personally identifiable information in systems and processes. Care-Centered Value Sensitive Design (CCVSD) proposed by Aimee van Wynsberghe is another example of how the VSD approach is modified to account for the values central to care for the design and development of care robots.

== Design process ==
VSD uses an iterative design process that involves three types of investigations: conceptual, empirical and technical. Conceptual investigations aim at understanding and articulating the various stakeholders of the technology, as well as their values and any values conflicts that might arise for these stakeholders through the use of the technology. Empirical investigations are qualitative or quantitative design research studies used to inform the designers' understanding of the users' values, needs, and practices. Technical investigations can involve either analysis of how people use related technologies, or the design of systems to support values identified in the conceptual and empirical investigations. Friedman and Hendry account seventeen methods, including their main purpose, an overview of its function as well as key references:

1. Stakeholder Analysis (Purpose: Stakeholder identification and legitimation): Identification of individuals, groups, organizations, institutions, and societies that might reasonably be affected by the technology under investigation and in what ways. Two overarching stakeholder categories: (1) those who interact directly with the technology, direct stakeholders; and (2) those indirectly affected by the technology, indirect stakeholders.
2. Stakeholder Tokens (Purpose: Stakeholder identification and interaction): Playful and versatile toolkit for identifying stakeholders and their interactions. Stakeholder tokens facilitate identifying stakeholders, distinguishing core from peripheral stakeholders, surfacing excluded stakeholders, and articulating relationships among stakeholders.
3. Value Source Analysis (Purpose: Identify value sources): Distinguish among the explicitly supported project values, designers’ personal values, and values held by other direct and indirect stakeholders.
4. Co-evolution of Technology and Social Structure (Purpose: Expand design space): Expanding the design space to include social structures integrated with technology may yield new solutions not possible when considering the technology alone. As appropriate, engage with the design of both technology and social structure as part of the solution space. Social structures may include policy, law, regulations, organizational practices, social norms, and others.
5. Value Scenario (Purpose: Values representation and elicitation): Narratives, comprising stories of use, intended to surface human and technical aspects of technology and context. Value scenarios emphasize implications for direct and indirect stakeholders, related key values, widespread use, indirect impacts, longer-term use, and similar systemic effects.
6. Value Sketch (Purpose: Values representation and elicitation): Sketching activities as a way to tap into stakeholders’ non-verbal understandings, views, and values about a technology.
7. Value-oriented Semi-structured Interview (Purpose: Values elicitation): Semi-structured interview questions as a way to tap into stakeholders’ understandings, views and values about a technology. Questions typically emphasize stakeholders’ evaluative judgments (e.g., all right or not all right) about a technology as well as rationale (e.g., why?). Additional considerations introduced by the stakeholder are pursued.
8. Scalable Information Dimensions (Purpose: Values elicitation): Sets of questions constructed to tease apart the impact of pervasiveness, proximity, granularity of information, and other scalable dimensions. Can be used in interview or survey formats.
9. Value-oriented Coding Manual (Purpose: Values analysis): Hierarchically structured categories for coding qualitative responses to the value representation and elicitation methods. Coding categories are generated from the data and a conceptualization of the domain. Each category contains a label, definition, and typically up to three sample responses from empirical data. Can be applied to oral, written, and visual responses.
10. Value-oriented Mockup, Prototype or Field Deployment (Purpose: Values representation and elicitation): Development, analysis, and co-design of mockups, prototypes and field deployments to scaffold the investigation of value implications of technologies that are yet to be built or widely adopted. Mock-ups, prototypes or field deployments emphasize implications for direct and indirect stakeholders, value tensions, and technology situated in human contexts.
11. Ethnographically Informed Inquiry regarding Values and Technology (Purpose: Values, technology and social structure framework and analysis): Framework and approach for data collection and analysis to uncover the complex relationships among values, technology and social structure as those relationships unfold. Typically involves indepth engagement in situated contexts over longer periods of time.
12. Model for Informed Consent Online (Purpose: Design principles and values analysis): Model with corresponding design principles for considering informed consent in online contexts. The construct of informed encompasses disclosure and comprehension; that of consent encompasses voluntariness, competence, and agreement. Furthermore, implementations of informed consent.
13. Value Dams and Flows (Purpose: Values analysis): Analytic method to reduce the solution space and resolve value tensions among design choices. First, design options that even a small percentage of stakeholders strongly object to are removed from the design space—the value dams. Then of the remaining design options, those that a good percentage of stakeholders find appealing are foregrounded in the design—the value flows. Can be applied to the design of both technology and social structures.
14. Value Sensitive Action-Reflection Model (Purpose: Values representation and elicitation): Reflective process for introducing value sensitive prompts into a co-design activity. Prompts can be designer or stakeholder generated.
15. Multi-lifespan timeline (Purpose: Priming longer-term and multi-generational design thinking): Priming activity for longer-term design thinking. Multi-lifespan timelines prompt individuals to situate themselves in a longer time frame relative to the present, with attention to both societal and technological change.
16. Multi-lifespan co-design (Purpose: Longer-term design thinking and envisioning): Co-design activities and processes that emphasize longer-term anticipatory futures with implications for multiple and future generations.
17. Envisioning Cards (Purpose: Value sensitive design toolkit for industry, research, and educational practice): Value sensitive envisioning toolkit. A set of 32 cards, the Envisioning Cards build on four criteria: stakeholders, time, values, and pervasiveness. Each card contains on one side a title and an evocative image related to the card theme; on the flip side, the envisioning criterion, card theme, and a focused design activity. Envisioning Cards can be used for ideation, co-design, heuristic critique, and evaluation. The second edition of the Envision Cards was published online under the CC BY-NC-ND 4.0 license in 2024. This second edition of the Envisioning Cards brings together under one cohesive design the original set of 32 Envisioning Cards published in 2011 including the four suits—Stakeholders, Time, Values, and Pervasiveness—with the supplementary set of 13 Envisioning Cards published in 2018 with the Multi-lifespan suit.

VSD has been applied in some fields of technology where human values are part of the design and deployment of various technological systems. VSD has also been applied to artificial intelligence and algorithmic systems, where it has been translated into design requirements based on privacy, fairness, accountability, trust, autonomy and human well-being. This use of VSD has led to stakeholder engagement, AI's ability to predict possible harms and the creation of systems aligned with societal values that are transparent and accountable. It has, therefore, been identified as an important framework for AI governance and the design of AI systems with a good social intent.

In healthcare technologies, VSD has also been used in the creation of care robots, EHR (electronic health records) and many other assistive technologies designed to enhance patient autonomy, dignity, trust and quality of care. These applications of VSD assist in sustaining the connections among patient, caregiver and technological system, guaranteeing that technological systems respect the ethical and emotional aspects of healthcare practice.

Another application of VSD is in privacy and information systems. In these cases, VSD has been reported to work by combining user values into the design of the system, such as in relation to achieving informed consent, system data management, and privacy protection. Examples include the introduction of informed consent tools in Mozilla, a web browser, an obvious illustration of how much privacy and user control can be woven into the development of software. In addition, Privacy by Design and user-centred data governance have been impacted.

Also, VSD cannot be ignored in the context of social media platforms and educational technologies, where it holds significant importance when it comes to challenges posed by the usage of recommendation systems, content moderation, inclusiveness, and the well-being of users. In the area of educational technology, VSD has been known to support promoting aspects of accessibility, equity, meaningful participation, and autonomy of learners.,

== Criticisms ==
Two commonly cited criticisms are critiques of the heuristics of values on which VSD is built. These critiques have been forwarded by Le Dantec et al. and Manders-Huits. Le Dantec et al. argue that formulating a pre-determined list of implicated values runs the risk of ignoring important values that can be elicited from any given empirical case by mapping those value a priori. Manders-Huits instead takes on the concept of ‘values’ itself with VSD as the central issue. She argues that the traditional VSD definition of values as “what a person or group of people consider important in life” is nebulous and runs the risk of conflating stakeholders preferences with moral values.

Wessel Reijers and Bert Gordijn have built upon the criticisms of Le Dantec et alia and Manders-Huits that the value heuristics of VSD are insufficient given their lack of moral commitment. They propose that a heuristic of virtues stemming from a virtue ethics approach to technology design, mostly influenced by the works of Shannon Vallor, provides a more holistic approach to technology design. Steven Umbrello has criticized this approach arguing that not only can the heuristic of values be reinforced but that VSD does make moral commitments to at least three universal values: human well-being, justice and dignity. Batya Friedman and David Hendry, in "Value Sensitive Design: Shaping Technology with Moral Imagination", argue that although earlier iterations of the VSD approach did not make explicit moral commitments, it has since evolved over the past two decades to commit to at least those three fundamental values.

VSD as a standalone approach has also been criticized as being insufficient for the ethical design of artificial intelligence. This criticism is predicated on the self-learning and opaque artificial intelligence techniques like those stemming from machine learning and, as a consequence, the unforeseen or unforeseeable values or disvalues that may emerge after the deployment of an AI system. Steven Umbrello and Ibo van de Poel propose a modified VSD approach that uses the Artificial Intelligence for Social Good (AI4SG) factors as norms to translate abstract philosophical values into tangible design requirements. What they propose is that full-lifecycle monitoring is necessary to encourage redesign in the event that unwanted values manifest themselves during the deployment of a system.

== See also ==
- UrbanSim
- Batya Friedman
- Jeroen van den Hoven
- Ibo van de Poel
- Aimee van Wynsberghe
- Alan Borning
- Behnam Taebi
- Steven Umbrello
- Values-based innovation
- Positive computing
