= Value-based engineering =

Software engineering process

Value-based engineering (VBE) is a system development and innovation approach that is based on the IEEE Standard "7000-2021 - IEEE Standard Model Process for Addressing Ethical Concerns during System Design" (IEEE 7000). IEEE 7000 was first released in 2021 and it was adopted by the International Organization for Standardization as ISO/IEC/IEEE 24748-7000:2022 (ISO 24748-7000) in November 2022.

In July 2024, Austrian Standards launched the personelle certification "Value-based Engineering Ambassador for Ethical" allowing for individuals to demonstrate competence against the standard ISO/IEC/IEEE 24748-7000 in connection with elements of the management standard ISO/IEC 42001 for AI. The City of Vienna announced in October 2024 to use Value-based Engineering within the city government for the improvement of the web portal mein.wien, including the goal of at least one certification against the underlying standard IEEE 7000.

== Standard Development and the relationship to Value-based Engineering ==
The underlying standard IEEE 7000 was developed over a five-year period starting in 2016 and is based on the initial work published in "Ethical IT innovation: A value-based system design approach" in 2015. Published in 2021, the standard's goal is to "enable organizations to design systems with explicit consideration of individual and societal ethical values". It is the first engineering standard designed to integrate ethical considerations into system design by providing a structured methodology for identifying stakeholder values, assessing ethical risks, and embedding them into technical requirements. It thereby serves as a bridge between ethics and engineering.

VBE is a practical implementation of IEEE 7000, condensing and structuring its methodology into actionable steps.

== The VBE Process ==
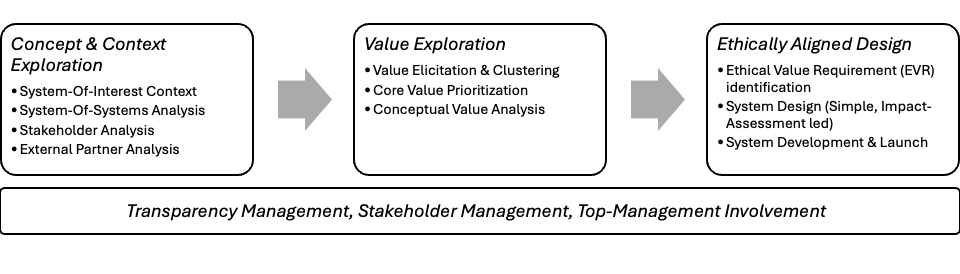
An overview of the 3-step VBE process.

In VBE, ethical system design is achieved following a three-step processes:

1. Concept and Context Exploration: This process step aims to gain an initial understanding of the context, relevant stakeholders, legal, social, environmental, and ethical feasibility, and control over the intended external partners of a proposed system, and to develop a tangible concept of operations.
2. Value Exploration: The impact of a proposed system on values and virtues is investigated using a utilitarian, virtue ethics, duty ethics, and culture-specific perspectives. While the utilitarian perspective identifies harms and benefits to the direct and indirect stakeholders, the virtue ethics perspective identifies potentially harmful virtue effects, and the duty ethics perspective considers the impact of the system on duty-ethical principles. The identified impacts are clustered according to the value they pertain to and clusters are prioritized.
3. Ethically Aligned Design: During this process step the identified and prioritized value clusters are used to derive Ethical Value Requirements (EVRs). EVRs are of technical or organizational nature and can be identified by stakeholders (bottom up) or though conceptional analysis (top down). VBE uses threat analysis for low risk systems or a more detailed impact assessment for high risk systems to derive specific system requirements.

Transparency Management, Stakeholder Management and Top-Management Involvement are parallel activities spanning across all steps of the VBE Process.

By offering a clear step-by-step process, VBE allows for a derivation of traceable requirements which address the identified ethical concerns.

== The ten principles of VBE ==
VBE complements IEEE St. 7000 by introducing ten principles essential for addressing ethical concerns during system design.

1. Ecosystem Responsibility. Value-Based Engineering organizations take responsibility for their technical ecosystem, ensuring that all partners and services they integrate align with ethical standards.
2. Willingness to Renounce Investment. Ethical organizations actively consider not investing in a system if ethical concerns cannot be resolved, even at the cost of financial opportunity.
3. Stakeholder Inclusiveness. VBE organizations engage stakeholders, including critical voices, in an open and honest dialogue to align system design with societal expectations.
4. Use Moral Philosophies for Value Elicitation. Ethical system design should be guided by established moral philosophies such as Utilitarianism, Virtue Ethics, and Duty Ethics, as well as relevant spiritual traditions.
5. Context Sensitivity. Instead of relying on generic value lists, VBE organizations perform context-sensitive analysis to understand the unique ethical impacts of a system.
6. Respect for Regional Laws and International Agreements. Organizations should proactively respect legal frameworks and regional values.
7. Leadership Engagement. Corporate leaders must personally endorse ethical principles, ensuring that core values are not just strategic buzzwords but fundamental to decision-making.
8. Transparency of the Value Mission. VBE organizations document and share their Ethical Policy Statement and Value Register, ensuring transparent alignment between ethics and system requirements.
9. Understanding Values in Depth. Core values should be analyzed conceptually, ensuring that all relevant ethical dimensions (e.g., privacy, fairness, safety) are accounted for in system design.
10. Using Risk-Analysis for System Requirements Elicitation. Ethical Value Requirements (EVRs) should be translated into system requirements using risk analysis, ensuring that potential ethical breaches are mitigated.

== Case studies and applications ==
Several publications cover the use of VBE in terms of academic case studies and application in areas such as defense. A white paper on the use of Artificial Intelligence in defense issued by the European Defence Agency recommends the use of VBE for the design of all systems. VBE has also been used for the assessment of ethical risks and opportunities beyond traditional IT system development.

As part of the engineering process, not all uses of VBE are known. However notable organizations in the public and private sector have announced use cases they have applied VBE to, these include:

- VBE as part of the City of Vienna's Agenda 2030, where the city's citizen platform Mein Wien is part of the evaluation.
- VBE as an evaluation method for the assessment of an ERP system roll out by a training provider.
- The use of VBE in the Ethical Impact Assessment conducted under the FEASTS project, which examined the ethical opportunities and risks of cultured meat and seafood technologies.

The Digital Humanism Award 2025 has seen IEEE and Austrian Standards amongst the winners for their engagement with VBE.

== See also ==
- Value sensitive design
- Value-based innovation
- Stakeholder theory
