= VBE (disambiguation) =

VBE may refer to:

- VESA BIOS Extensions, a video board software standard
- .vbe, the filename extension for VBScript
- Vila das Belezas (São Paulo Metro), the station code VBE
- V_{BE}, the best endurance speed
- Value-based engineering, an engineering method for the development of ethically aligned systems
