= Genetic Discrimination Observatory =

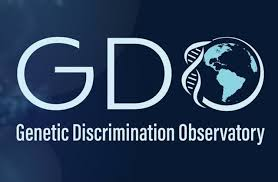
- Founded: June 2018
- Type: Non-governmental organization
- Headquarters: Centre of Genomics and Policy, McGill University in Montreal, Quebec, Canada
- Fields: Genetic discrimination, Empirical research, Policy guidance, Public engagement, Provision of information and tools
- Key people: Yann Joly (Research Director) Diya Uberoi (Associate Director)
- Website: gdo.global/en

The Genetic Discrimination Observatory (GDO) is a Montreal-based international network of researchers and other stakeholders who support the research and prevention of genetic discrimination (GD)—discrimination based on genetics or other predictive health information. Their headquarters are currently located at the Centre of Genomics and Policy at McGill University in Montreal.

== Staff and funding ==
The GDO staff comes from various fields such as genetics, ethics, law, sociology, and public policy. The GDO received initial funding from Genome Canada (Génome Québec in French), the Fonds de recherche du Québec – Santé, and the Network of Applied Medical Genetics (RMGA).

== Background ==
With increased incorporation of genomic technologies, genetic discrimination has become a multifaceted concern that can infringe upon human rights and hinder public trust in genetic services. Broadly defined, Genetic Discrimination occurs when an individual or group is unfairly treated, profiled, or harmed based on actual or presumed genetic characteristics. If not adequately regulated, genetic discrimination can discourage individuals from accessing clinical genetic services or undergoing genetic testing due to concerns about the potential misuse of their genetic information. In today’s postgenomic era, where AI and other advances have made it easier for individuals to access and process personal information, it has become all the more crucial to address genetic discrimination.

== Mission ==
With the aim to prevent genetic discrimination, the GDO seeks to develop multidisciplinary solutions that can be adopted by researchers, policymakers and other stakeholders globally. Over the years, the network has created a range of policy and educational tools to identify, prevent, and respond to instances of genetic discrimination. Some of these tools include:

=== Maps used to monitor ===
- Legal frameworks against genetic discrimination
- Empirical studies on genetic discrimination in life insurance
- U.S. state laws and international regulations
- Number of DNA profiles collected by governments in G20 countries

=== Collection of Personal Accounts of Genetic Discrimination used to document ===
- Real-life cases of genetic discrimination
- Personal experiences shared by affected individuals
- Insights into the impact of genetic discrimination

=== Educational Resources designed to raise awareness and promote understanding, including ===
- A Resource hub on the GDO website
- Educational videos
- Definitions and case studies

== Projects ==
Research is fundamental to raising awareness of genetic discrimination, informing policy development, and assessing its societal impact. Each year, the organization advances both collaborative initiatives and core member-led studies aimed at identifying, preventing, and addressing instances of genetic discrimination. Past projects have explored the definition of genetic discrimination and the characteristics of effective non-discrimination policies. A key part of this effort is the organization’s annual conference, which brings members together to share insights, discuss jurisdictional updates, and explore policy developments. Covering themes such as evolving definitions, regulatory challenges, and the intersection of genomics and human rights, the conference has informed the development of numerous collaborative and member-led-research initiatives.

=== Past Collaborative Projects ===
==== Defining Genetic Discrimination ====
This foundational project seeks to establish a clear and inclusive definition of genetic discrimination, recognizing its systemic and stigmatizing effects. Published by JAMA Network Open, the study provides an academic framework to guide policy and legal discussions, ensuring that evolving regulatory approaches reflect the full scope of genetic discrimination.

==== The Key Features of a Genetic Nondiscrimination Policy ====
This project aimed to identify key elements of an effective genetic nondiscrimination policy and provide guidance to policymakers in addressing genetic discrimination and related public concerns.

=== Current Collaborative Project ===
==== The Use of Pharmacogenomic Information by Insurers ====
Genetic discrimination (GD) can have both positive and negative implications, and while much of the recent literature has focused on its role in underwriting, this project goes beyond underwriting to assess the adequacy of legislative frameworks in broader contexts. By analyzing regulatory approaches across 20 international jurisdictions, the study aims to identify those approaches that best balance scientific progress with privacy and ethical protections.

=== Present Core Member-Led Project ===
==== Leveraging Human Rights to Clarify the Risk of Genetic Discrimination in Pediatric Oncology ====
Even though states have regulated genetic discrimination, the rate at which it occurs remains uncertain. As a core GDO team project, this initiative examines fears and risks of genetic discrimination in pediatric oncology, particularly for children with rare cancers. Funded by the ACCESS Network and the Canadian Institute for Health Research, the study explores the role human rights play in addressing concerns associated with genetic discrimination.

=== Select Publications ===
==== The Key Features of a Genetic Nondiscrimination Policy A Delphi Consensus Statement ====
Uberoi Diya, Dalpé Gratien, Cheung Katherine, Kondrup Emma, Palmour Nicole, Arawi Thalia, et al. The Key Features of a Genetic Nondiscrimination Policy A Delphi Consensus Statement. JAMA Netw Open. 2024; Available from: https://jamanetwork.com/journals/jamanetworkopen/fullarticle/2824110

==== A proposal for an inclusive working definition of genetic discrimination to promote a more coherent debate ====
Kaiser Beatrice, Uberoi Diya, Raven-Adams Maili C., Cheung Katherine, Bruns Andreas, Chandrasekharan Subhashini, et al. A proposal for an inclusive working definition of genetic discrimination to promote a more coherent debate. Nat Genet. 2024; Available from: https://www.nature.com/articles/s41588-024-01786-8

==== Establishing the International Genetic Discrimination Observatory ====
Joly Yann, Dalpe Gratien, Dupras Charles, Bévière-Boyer Bénédicte, de Paor Aisling, Dove Edward S., et al. Establishing the International Genetic Discrimination Observatory. Nat Genet. 2020;52(5):466-468. Available from: https://www.nature.com/articles/s41588-020-0606-5

==== Genetic discrimination: international perspectives ====
Otlowski M., Taylor S., Bombard Y. Genetic discrimination: international perspectives. Annu Rev Genomics Hum Genet. 2012;13:433-454. Available from: https://www.annualreviews.org/doi/abs/10.1146/annurev-genom-090711-163800

==== Genetic discrimination in life insurance: a human rights issue ====
Tiller Jane, Delatycki Martin B. Genetic discrimination in life insurance: a human rights issue. Journal of Medical Ethics. 2021;47(7):484-485. Available from: https://jme.bmj.com/content/47/7/484

== See also ==
- Genetic discrimination
