= Values-based innovation =

Theoretical concept and managerial approach

Values-based innovation is a theoretical concept and managerial approach that “understands and applies individual, organisational, societal, and global values, and corresponding normative orientations as a basis for innovation”. It demonstrates the potential of values to integrate diverse stakeholders into innovation processes, to direct collaborative efforts, and to generate innovations with a positive impact on societal challenges. It elaborates upon the interrelations between innovation management, an established management practice and field of research, and values-based management, which is generally dealt with in business ethics and focuses on the ethical concerns related to corporate management.

== History of origin ==
Human values are considered as having a profound impact on every level of social life: individual, organizational, institutional, societal, and global. As such they provide valuable points of reference for understanding corporate stakeholders, such as shareholders, employees, customers, partners, etc., and catering to their needs through innovation. For instance, changing stakeholder values as well as new public policies and normative frameworks, such as the European Green Deal or UN's Sustainable Development Goals, have created new challenges and opportunities for sustainability-oriented innovation. There are several innovation discourses that have emerged in response to these new challenges, such as on responsible innovation, social and sustainable innovation. By reflecting upon normative statements and considering stakeholder values (rather than just short-lived interests), these new streams have taken the first steps to explore the relationships between particular values, such as pro-environmental values, intergenerational justice and equity, values of sustainability-oriented business, protection of privacy, or safety. In parallel to them the values-based view on innovation has emerged on the grounds of a broader perspective, non-prescriptive with regard to particular values.

Several publications, books and academic conferences have elaborated on the concept of values-based innovation. Notably, Breuer and Lüdeke-Freund proposed a theoretical framework of values-based innovation management, which addresses the potential of values, defined as subjective notions of the desirable, for driving corporate renewal. The framework builds on the exploration of cases that demonstrate how companies have become successful by leading their innovation activities based on values and normative orientations, rather than by an opportunistic search for new revenue potentials or a strategic search for competitive advantages. According to the authors, these companies adopt a values-based approach to manage innovation management, i.e. to identify and systematically use values as a source and guide for innovation. In doing so they utilize the potential of values to integrate diverse stakeholders into innovation processes, to direct collaborative efforts, and to generate new processes, products, services or business models within and across organisations. A special issue of the International Journal of Innovation Management on Managing Values for Innovation highlights the managerial work necessary to comprehend various stakeholder values, implement them, reevaluate their significance, and evaluate the outcomes of the innovation process with respect to the values guiding it.

== Classification of values-based innovation ==
The framework of values-based innovation management elaborates upon the Integrated Management Concept to differentiate between three particular dimensions of management, namely normative, strategic, and instrumental. Values impact innovation management on each of these dimensions and can lead to different types of values-based innovation. For instance, normative innovation creates new inter-organizational networks based on shared values, or develops new organizational identities (e.g. through reformulation of normative statements, such as core values, visions and missions), strategic innovation redesigns business models, and instrumental innovation deals with the renewal of processes, products and service offerings.

The three types of values-based innovation are triggered and facilitated by the integrative, directive and generative functions that values fulfill on all three management dimensions and with respect to different stakeholders. The integrative function aligns the values and interests of diverse stakeholders both within or outside of the organization. It can be initiated either top-down (based on authoritative directives defined by top management), bottom-up (based on changing values of employees or customers), or due to external or peripheral pressures (e.g. based on legislation or new social trends). The directive function provides an orientation to what an innovation project strives to achieve and help its participants to cope with uncertainty. Finally, the generative function refers to the use of existing, changing, and new values as heuristics in ideation, screening and evaluation processes as well as in defining new strategies for innovation.

Rindova and Martins suggest a similar classification of the functions that values fulfill in organizations with respect to strategic management. First, values can serve as identity makers that enable integration, engagement and mobilization of stakeholders. Second, values can serve as design principles that enable prioritization and integration of strategic choices across domains. Third, values can provide strategists with valuation lenses, "which enable them to select different target market segments and resources for the pursuit of their strategies".

=== Values-based vs value-based management ===
The values-based view is not to be confused with the ‘value-based view’ in business management or innovation studies. While the term value refers to the aim of maximizing a company's financial value, which follows from the shareholder value paradigm, values refer to the subjective notions of the desirable, expressed as beliefs, attitudes and behaviors. According to the values-based view on innovation management, these human values and normative orientations, that underlie an organization's attitudes and behaviors, are pursued by all organizations. Therefore, the values-based view implies an understanding of what is most important for an innovation project, an organisation, or what a firm stands for. It includes, but is not limited to, financial performance goals.

== Values-based innovation methods ==
The values-based innovation management framework reframes several methodological approaches in order to leverage the integrative, directive, and generative functions of values to foster innovation activities. For instance, future scenarios may be created to explore alternative future developments, but also to formulate normative scenarios that describe a desired state of affairs and the path to its attainment. Business anthropology and ethnographic methods can be used to empirically explore and analyse values and values-based cultural practice within and across organisations, or for different stakeholder groups. Values-based business modelling activities can facilitate the exploration and elaboration of values-based business model innovation. Various methods have been developed to support the design of (responsible) innovation ecosystems based on sustainability values and normative frameworks such as the SDGs.

With respect to responsible research and innovation Boenink and Kudina suggest several implications for innovation methods that stem from their practice-oriented perspective on values, i.e. the conceptualization of values as evolving results of valuing processes rather than as stable entities. For example, the authors stress the importance of using hermeneutic and other qualitative methods (focus groups, case studies, interpretative phenomenological analysis) in order to understand how values manifest in innovation practices.

Nevertheless, Castellazzi and Bellini have suggested a new theoretical framework to examine how values drive radical innovation and to pinpoint practical techniques to support values-based radical innovation. The framework introduces a taxonomy of four empirical innovation methodologies that can be used to examine an organization's core values: ‘assessment-oriented, matching-oriented, reflection-oriented, and development-oriented’. These approaches differ from one another by emphasizing the history, present, or future of an organization as well as by being process- or content-oriented.

== Use cases ==
Different authors have described both historical and current case studies that demonstrate and differentiate the notion of values-based innovation. Examples include large companies such as Aravind, IBM, Tata Motors and LEGO, but also start-ups such as the green Internet search engine Ecosia which evolved its business model based on a set of six core values, illustrating the integrative, directive, and generative potential of values-based innovation management or ventures emerging from the German's GIZ incubation programme, The Lab of Tomorrow. An EU funded research project named IMPACT researches the potentials of values-based innovation to advance sustainable business impact in European firms.

A values-based innovation competencies model with activating variables for the temporal development of competences is proposed by Faccin and colleagues by conducting research with the largest textile and fashion retailer in Brazil, as well as with customers, suppliers, and college students to identify extra skills needed to create a values-based network among stakeholders.

Also, using longitudinal case study approach, Wadin and Bengtsson identify the skills needed to engage in sustainability-oriented business model renewal and innovation. They discover that a firm's stakeholders' expectations, interests, and underlying values serve as a driving force for innovation activities, make such efforts explicit, and result in a reconfiguration of capacities for the development of sustainable business models. Similar longitudinal study emphasized the benefits of merging values- and evidence-based innovation management, enhancing radical and breakthrough ideation, and promoting an innovation culture in a mid-sized B2B organization.

== Opportunities and limitations ==
Appropriate consideration and integration of stakeholder values has been demonstrated as a predictive factor for superior innovation performance, both from a purely economic perspective and in terms of sustainability.

Reviewing the current literature reveals gaps in terms of empirical cases, applicable methods for researchers and practitioners, and theoretical frameworks. Only few studies have investigated, for example, the impact of values on financial or innovation performance, or found indicators for a positive relationship between organisational values, business model innovation and corporate financial performance. Therefore, knowledge about the normative turn in innovation research and management and the ensuing values-based view on innovation is still in its inception.

== See also ==
- Corporate social responsibility
- Integrated Management Concept
- Responsible Research and Innovation
- Social innovation
- Stakeholder theory
- Value sensitive design
