= Batya Friedman =

American professor

- Education: University of California, Berkeley (PhD)
- Occupation: Professor
- Employer: University of Washington Information School
- Known for: Value sensitive design
- Website: https://ischool.uw.edu/people/faculty/profile/batya

Batya Friedman is an American professor in the University of Washington Information School. She is also an adjunct professor in the Paul G. Allen School of Computer Science and Engineering and adjunct professor in the Department of Human-Centered Design and Engineering, where she directs the Value Sensitive Design Research Lab. She received her PhD in learning sciences from the University of California, Berkeley School of Education in 1988, and has an undergraduate degree from Berkeley in computer science and mathematics.

== Work ==
Friedman is known for pioneering value sensitive design, an approach to account for human values in the design of information systems.

Currently, Friedman is the co-director of Value Sensitive Design Lab, and was the former co-director of the UW Technology Policy Lab.

== Awards ==
- 2021 ACM Fellow
- "Gilles Hondius Fellow" - Technical University of Delft, 2020
- Honorary Doctorate - Technical University of Delft, 2020
- ACM SIGCHI Academy - ACM SIGCHI, 2019
- Induction into Membership - ACM SIGCHI Academy, 2019
- Social Impact Award - ACM SIGCHI, 2012
- Multi-disciplinary Privacy Paper Award, 2010
- Multi-disciplinary Privacy Paper Award, Honorable Mention, 2010
- Best Paper Award, Organizational Systems Track - HCISS, 2002
- TAP: ACM list of notable female computer scientists, 1997

== Selected publications ==
- Friedman, B., & Hendry, D. G. (2019). Value sensitive design: shaping technology with moral imagination. Cambridge, MA. MIT Press. ISBN 9780262039536
- Friedman, B. (2008). Value Sensitive Design. In D. Schuler, Liberating Voices: A Pattern Language for Communication Revolution (pp. 366–368). The MIT Press ISBN 9780262195799
- Friedman, B., & Hendry, D. (2012). The envisioning cards: a toolkit for catalyzing humanistic and technical imaginations. Proceedings of the SIGCHI Conference on Human Factors in Computing Systems, 1145–1148.ISBN 978-1-4503-1015-4
- Friedman, B. (2004). Value Sensitive Design. In W. S. Bainbridge (Ed.), Encyclopedia of Human-computer Interaction (pp. 769–774). Berkshire Publishing Group. ISBN 9781591405627
- Friedman, B., & Kahn, P. H. (2003). Human values, ethics, and design. In A. Sears, J. A. Jacko, & S. Garfinkel, The Human-Computer Interaction Handbook: Fundamentals, Evolving Technologies and Emerging Applications (2nd ed., pp. 1241–1266). CRC Press.
- Friedman, B., & Kahn, P. H. (2000). New directions: a value-sensitive design approach to augmented reality. Proceedings of DARE 2000 on Designing Augmented Reality Environments, 163–164. ISBN 978-1-4503-7326-5
- Friedman, B. (1996, December 1). Value-sensitive design. ACM interactions, 3(6), 16–23.
- Friedman, B., & Kahn, P. H. (1992). Human agency and responsible computing: Implications for computer system design. Journal of Systems and Software, 17(1), 7–14.
