= Foundation for Responsible Robotics =

International non-government organization

- Formation: December 11, 2015; 10 years ago
- Founder: Aimee Van Wynsberghe (president), Noel Sharkey
- Purpose: Advocacy for ethical design and production of robots
- Headquarters: The Hague, Netherlands
- Website: responsiblerobotics.org

The Foundation for Responsible Robotics (FRR) is a not-for-profit non-government organization that advocates for the ethical design and production of robots.

== History ==
The FRR was officially launched on December 11, 2015, with the co-founders holding a press conference at the London-based Science Media Centre. The foundation was originally created as a response to automation taking over human jobs, even in situations in which it isn't fully capable of carrying out the task at hand. Both co-founders stressed the need for "accountability and responsibility" in the laws and policy related to the design and production of robots.

Since the foundation's launch, they have held multiple workshops addressing the increasing role of robots across multiple industries, along with potential solutions to ethical issues that may arise. Alongside this, they have launched a number of consultation reports addressing ethical scenarios in the field of robotics.

== Principles ==
A chief principle of the Foundation for Responsible Robotics is the adherence to "responsible robotics", a philosophy that consists of the following principles:

- Close attention to ethical decision making during the research and development of robot products. Particular focal points include a commitment to sustainable development and production, recognition of the need for diverse viewpoints as the technology is developed, and careful attention that any potential ethical issues are resolved before production rather than cleaned up after the product is released.
- A strong focus on consumer education, ensuring that consumers are informed on the ethical implications of using particular products, and ensuring that producers within the industry are operating transparently and are providing the necessary information that will lead consumers to make informed decisions.
- Imposing regulative laws and policies on the robotics industry, ensuring that there is proper legislation in place to act as a screen preventing unethical practices in the development and production of robots.

== Activities ==
A major part of the FRR's activities consists of producing consultation reports for both the general public and policy makers, consisting of an impartial analysis of certain topics within the field of robotics.

The foundation's first consultation report, Our Sexual Future with Robots, was released July 5th, 2017. The report consists of an overview of the current attributes and societal role of sex robots at the time of writing, and then poses a number of questions consisting of how robots would impact the sex industry and human perception of sexuality, all answered by scholars familiar with the topic at hand. The consultation report was later used by US Senator Dan Donovan, playing a role in his creation of HR 3665: CREEPER Act of 2017, a bill proposed that would prevent the distribution of child sex dolls within the United States.

Their second consultation report released by the foundation was Drones in the Service of Society. Officially presented on June 8, 2018, at The Hague's Peace Palace, this report outlines the multiple uses for drones in a humanitarian context, including disaster relief and environmental protection. The report also highlights the implications of humanitarian drone use on marginalized communities, such as refugees and anti-corruption activists.

The foundation is also committed to holding workshops on a number of topics within the field of robotics, addressing ethical issues that may arise while drafting potential solutions to these problems. Previous workshop topics include the current and future impact of robots on the healthcare sector, as well as a workshop dedicated to uniting participants from multiple disciplines to formulate a concrete definition of responsible robotics.

== Leadership ==
The Board of Directors is composed of the following:

- President - Aimee van Wynsberghe, Assistant Professor in Ethics and Technology at TU Delft
- Treasurer - Noel Sharkey, Emeritus Professor of AI and Robotics & Professor of Public Engagement at the University of Sheffield
- Secretary - Shannon Vallor, Professor of Philosophy at Santa Clara University

In addition to the Board of Directors, the foundation is also joined by over twenty scholars directly related to the topic of responsible robotics, serving as the Executive Board of the foundation.
