= Ethical, Legal and Social Aspects research =

The acronyms ELSI (in the United States) and ELSA (in Europe) refer to research activities that anticipate and address ethical, legal and social implications (ELSI) or aspects (ELSA) of emerging sciences, notably genomics and nanotechnology. ELSI was conceived in 1988 when James Watson, at the press conference announcing his appointment as director of the Human Genome Project (HGP), suddenly and somewhat unexpectedly declared that the ethical and social implications of genomics warranted a special effort and should be directly funded by the National Institutes of Health.

== Spread ==
Various ELSI or ELSA programs have been developed, in Canada, Europe and the Far East. Overview:

1. U.S.A.: Ethical, ....Legal and Social Implications (ELSI) (funding agency: NIH, 1990)
2. Canada: Genomics-related Ethical, Environmental, Economic, Legal and Social Aspects (GE3LS) (funding agency: Genome Canada, 2000)
3. South-Korea: Ethical, Legal and Social Implications (ELSI) (funding: Government of South-Korea, 2001)
4. United Kingdom: ESRC Genomics Network (EGN), including: Cesagen, Innogen, Egenis, Genomics Forum (funding agency: ESRC 2002)
5. Netherlands: Centre for Society and the Life Sciences (CSG) (funding agency: Netherlands Genomics Initiative, 2002); more recently the ELSA labs programme related to Artificial Intelligence
6. Norway: ELSA Program (funding agency: Research Council of Norway, 2002)
7. Germany, Austria, Finland: ELSAGEN Transnational Research Programme (funding agencies: GEN-AU, FFG, DFG, Academy of Finland, 2008)

== Features ==
At least four features seem typical for an ELSA approach, namely:

1. proximity (closeness to or embedding in large-scale scientific programs);
2. early anticipation (of societal issues and potential controversies);
3. interactivity (encouraging stakeholders and publics to assume an active role in co-designing research agendas);
4. interdisciplinarity (bridging boundaries between research communities such as for instance bioethics and STS).

== Reception ==
The ELSA approach has been widely endorsed by academics studying the societal impact of science and technology, but also criticized. Michael Yesley, responsible for the US Department of Energy (DOE) part of the ELSI programme, claims that the ELSI Program was in fact a discourse of justification, selecting topics of ethics research that will facilitate rather than challenge the advance of genetic technology. In other words, ELSA genomics as the handmaiden of genomics research. In Europe, in the context of the Horizon 2020 program, ELSA-style research is now usually framed as Responsible Research and Innovation. Examples of academic journals open to publishing ELSA research results are New Genetics and Society (Taylor and Francis) and Life Sciences, Society and Policy (SpringerOpen).
