= Ibo van de Poel =

Dutch professor

Ibo van de Poel is Antoni van Leeuwenhoek Professor in Ethics and Technology at Delft University of Technology.

== Academic contributions ==
According to Google Scholar, Van de Poel's work has been cited over 3700 times and he currently holds an h-index of 35. Additionally, he is the author of the first Dutch textbook on ethics and technology.

== Books ==
- Van de Poel, Ibo, Donna C. Mehos, and Lotte Asveld, eds. (2018). New Perspectives on Technology in Society: Experimentation Beyond the Laboratory. Oxon and New York: Routledge. ISBN 9781138204010
- Van de Poel, Ibo, Lamber Royakkers, and Sjoerd D. Zwart. 2015. Moral Responsibility and the Problem of Many Hands: Routledge. ISBN 9781138838550
- van den Hoven, Jeroen, Pieter E. Vermaas, and Ibo Van de Poel, eds. 2015. Handbook of ethics and values in technological design. Sources, Theory, Values and Application Domains: Springer. ISBN 9789400769694
- Doorn, Neelke, Daan Schuurbiers, Ibo van de Poel, and Michael E. Gorman, eds. 2013. Early engagement and new technologies: Opening up the laboratory. Dordrecht: Springer. ISBN 9789400778436
- Van de Poel, Ibo, and Lambèr Royakkers. 2011. Ethics, technology and engineering. Oxford: Wiley-Blackwell. ISBN 9781444330953
- Vermaas, Pieter, Peter Kroes, Ibo van de Poel, Maarten Franssen, and Wybo Houkes. 2011. A Philosophy of Technology: From Technical Artefacts to Sociotechnical Systems. Vol. 6, Synthesis Lectures on Engineers, Technology and Society. ISBN 9781608455980
- Vincent, Nicole, Ibo Van de Poel, and Jeroen Van den Hoven, eds. 2011. Moral Responsibility. Beyond free will and determinism. Dordrecht: Springer. ISBN 9789400718777
- Van de Poel, Ibo, and David E. Goldberg, eds. 2010. Philosophy and engineering. An emerging agenda. Dordrecht: Springer. ISBN 9789048128037

== Selected publications ==
- van de Poel, Ibo (1 September 2020). "Embedding Values in Artificial Intelligence (AI) Systems". Minds and Machines. 30 (3): 385–409. doi:10.1007/s11023-020-09537-4.
- Van de Poel, Ibo, and Martin Sand. 2018. "Varieties of responsibility: two problems of responsible innovation." Synthese. doi.org/10.1007/s11229-018-01951-7
- Van de Poel, Ibo. 2018. "Design for value change." Ethics and Information Technology. doi.org/10.1007/s10676-018-9461-9
- Van de Poel, Ibo. 2016. "An Ethical Framework for Evaluating Experimental Technology." Science and Engineering Ethics 22 (3):667-686. doi.org/10.1007/s11948-015-9724-3
- Van de Poel, Ibo. 2015. "Morally experimenting with nuclear energy." In The Ethics of Nuclear Energy: Risk, Justice and Democracy in the post-Fukushima Era, edited by Behnam Taebi and Sabine Roeser, 179-199. Cambridge: Cambridge University Press. ISBN 9781107674974
- Van de Poel, Ibo. 2013. "Translating values into design requirements." In Philosophy and Engineering: Reflections on Practice, Principles and Process, edited by D. Mitchfelder, N. McCarty and D.E. Goldberg, 253-266. Dordrecht: Springer. ISBN 9789400777613
- Van de Poel, Ibo, Jessica Nihlén Fahlquist, Neelke Doorn, Sjoerd Zwart, and Lambèr Royakkers. 2012. "The Problem of Many Hands: Climate Change as an Example." Science and Engineering Ethics 18 (1):49-68. 10.1007/s11948-011-9276-0
- Van de Poel, Ibo, and Jessica Nihlen-Fahlquist. 2012. "Risk and responsibility." In Handbook of Risk Theory, edited by Sabine Roeser, Rafaela Hillerbrand, Martin Peterson and Per Sandin, 877-907. Dordrecht: Springer.
- Van de Poel, Ibo, and Sjoerd D. Zwart. 2010. "Reflective Equilibrium in R&D Networks." Science, Technology, & Human Values 35 (2):174-199. doi.org/10.1177/0162243909340272
