= Positive computing =

Technological design approach

Positive computing is a technological design perspective that embraces psychological well-being and ethical practice, aiming at building a digital environment to support happier and healthier users. Positive computing develops approaches that incorporates psychology, education, neuroscience, and HCI with technological development, bridging technology with mental health.

== Background ==
The design of a tool impacts the people who use it. Small design implications of technologies can have their effects amplified when used by many people. Technology researchers typically focus primarily on technical aspects, paying less attention to the ethical impact and ethical considerations of their products. However, researchers from other fields such as psychology and philosophy studied these matters extensively and provided a wealth of methodologies to assess users' well-being, with thousands of quality-of-life assessment methods and validating studies.

Positive computing draws many ideas from positive psychology, a domain of psychology that focuses on societal well-being and improving quality of life.

=== Well-being in technology and technology research ===
The recognition of the impact of technology and inventions on people's lives has moved technology professionals to rethink the technology that people use and to seek a realignment of companies' goals with the social good.

Technologies can be loosely classified into four groups according to their influence on the psychological aspects:

- Technologies that are not positive computing oriented: technologies in this category do not consider the psychological well-being of the user nor their influence on society and ethical values.
- Technologies that hinder well-being integration: they present compromises and obstacles to the well-being of the users; obstacles that, from a positive computing perspective, are seen as errors. These technologies should undergo a process of redesign. For example, social network platforms may need to be redesigned to reduce negative behaviors and prevent conflict.
- Technologies that provide active integration with positive computing principles: technologies in this group are designed to actively support components of well-being. Examples might be a word processor redesigned to support flow or a social media website designed to promote empathy.
- Technology dedicated to positive computing: purposeful, dedicated to well-being. Examples: promote empathy, and increase mindfulness.

== What is positive ==
In Calvo's and Peter's seminal book on positive computing, they list the following as positive aspects to which we should aim when designing technologies: positive emotions, motivation, engagement, flow, self-awareness, self-compassion, mindfulness, empathy, compassion, and altruism. An encompassing term for general human welfare and happiness is eudaimonia which is extensively studied in positive psychology and which is inquired along different dimensions such as self-discovery, the sense of purpose and meaning in life, the involvement in activities, the investment in the pursuit of excellence, the self-perception of one's own potentials.

=== Autonomy, competence and relatedness ===
There are three basic psychological needs according to Self-determination theory (SDT): autonomy, competence, and relatedness, which can be briefly described as the feeling of psychological liberty and self-motivation, the feeling of having control and mastery, and the feeling of connection to others.

== Solutions ==
=== Design to address the basic psychological needs ===
The three previously mentioned basic psychological needs are measurable and well-defined characteristics that make them excellent as design targets.

To support autonomy, the design process needs to provide control over multiple options, provide meaningful rationales behind choices, enable the customization of the experience, and avoid controlling language.

Competence is also well-studied for game design, and the three main design factors supporting it are the appropriateness of the level of presented challenges, the presence of positive feedback, and the opportunities to learn and master the tasks at hand.

Relatedness-supportive environments need to be designed to provide meaningful and responsive interactions with others, respect human emotions, avoid disrupting social relationships, and provide opportunities for social connections.

=== Responsible design process ===
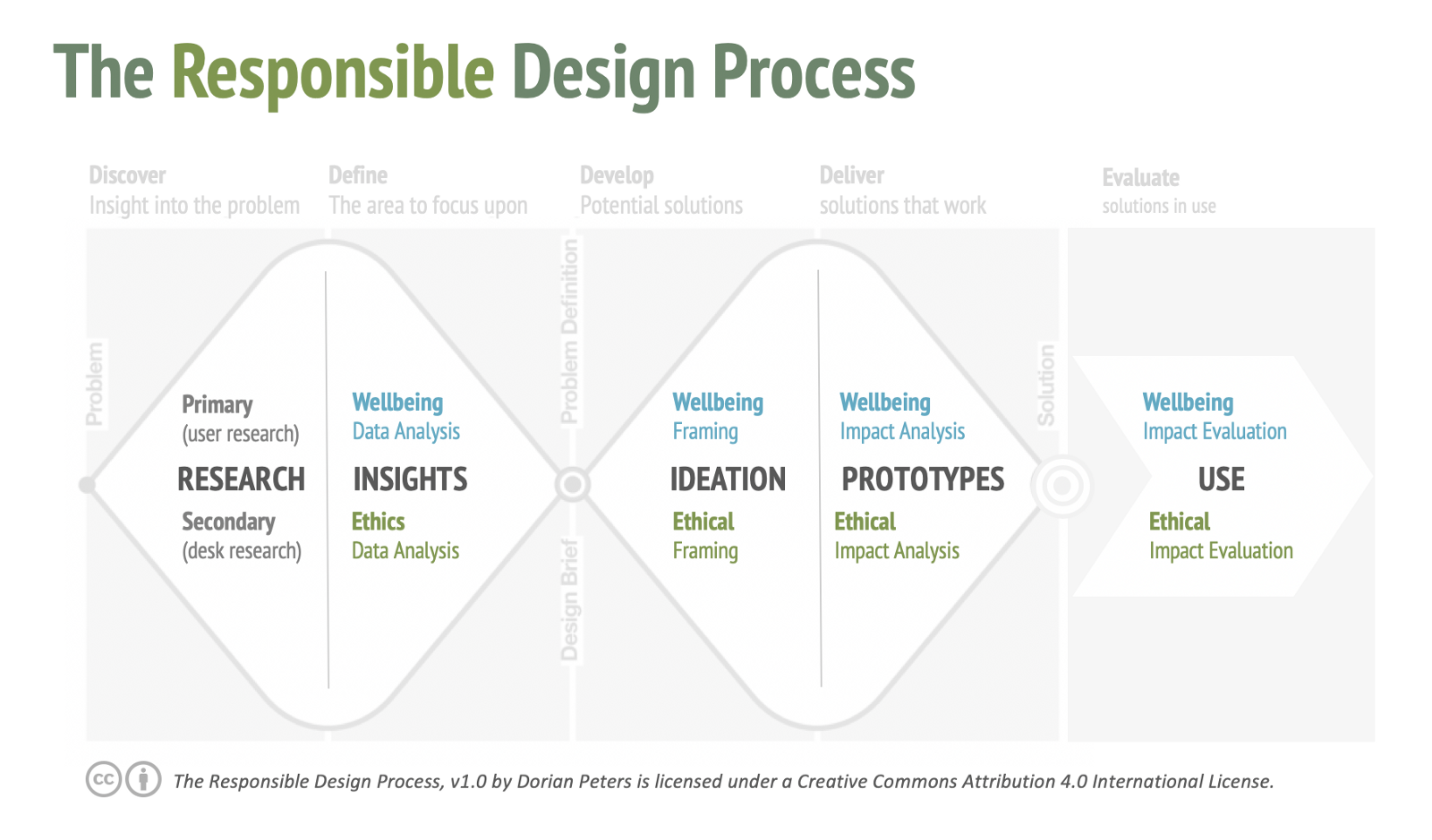
Infographic describing the responsible design process in its main components: discover, defined, develop, deliver, evaluate

Responsible design, not to be confused with responsive design, comes from the integration of ethical analysis with well-being–supportive design into engineering practice. In particular, it features the double diamond design process model adding a post-launch evaluation phase. The responsible design process consists then of five stages:

- Research: in this initial step, the designer team should investigate the needs of the users and the context in which they are immersed;
- Insights: this phase analyzes the data gathered in the previous one, synthesizing specific insights for the later stages;
- Ideation: this stage involves the generation of creative solutions that take into consideration the elicited technical and ethical requirements;
- Prototypes: in this last development stage, the team must eventually converge into practical solutions and build functioning prototypes to access the subsequent evaluation phase;
- Evaluation: this final phase comes after the rollout of the developed prototypes to evaluate their impact in the real-world scenario.

== Positive Computing in AI ==
Malo Bourgon, COO of MIRI, stated that research in artificial intelligence should consider best practices from the computer security community when testing their systems for safety and security before they are released for wide adoption. Government legislation, business practices, and stronger education of AI and its consequences to society are also proposed. These solutions implement the principles of positive computing into AI, making sure that it serves humanity in a positive way.

== Scientific venues ==
- Conference on Human Factors in Computing Systems (CHI)
- SIGCHI
- Journal of Medical Internet Research
- Journal of Cyberpsychology, Behavior, and Social Networking
- IEEE Transactions on Affective Computing

== See also ==
- Cyberpsychology
- Social computing
- Technology and society
- Ethics of technology
- Appropriate technology
- Affective computing
- Science and technology studies
- Tristan Harris
- Center for Humane Technology
- Value sensitive design
