= Aimee Van Wynsberghe =

AI ethics researcher

Aimee van Wynsberghe
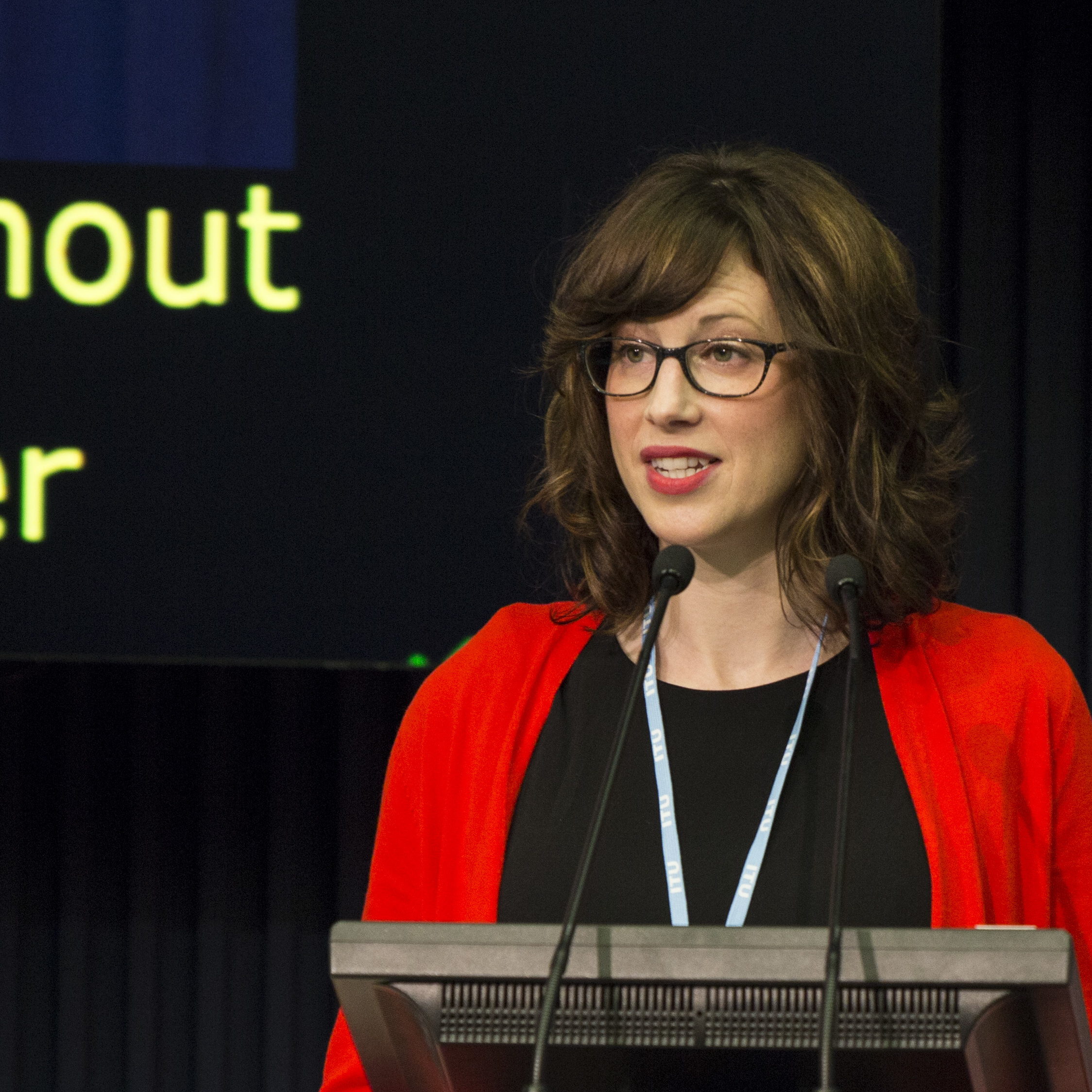
- Born: London, Ontario
- Education: University of Western Ontario, KU Leuven, University of Twente
- Occupation: AI ethicist
- Employer: University of Bonn
- Known for: President of Foundation for Responsible Robotics
- Website: aimeevanwynsberghe.com

Aimee van Wynsberghe is the Alexander von Humboldt professor for "Applied Ethics of Artificial Intelligence" at the University of Bonn, Germany. She is director of the Institute for Science and Ethics (IWE), founder of the Bonn Sustainable AI Lab and president of the Foundation for Responsible Robotics. Van Wynsberghe hosts the Sustainable AI Conference in Bonn, Germany, every other year.

== Education and career ==
Originally from London, Ontario, she received her bachelor's degree in cell biology from the University of Western Ontario, after which she obtained dual master's degrees in applied ethics and bioethics from KU Leuven in Belgium and the European Union's Erasmus Mundus program. She received her PhD from the University of Twente in 2012; her dissertation involved the creation of an ethical framework for the use of care robots in the medical field and was nominated for the Georges Giralt Award for best PhD thesis in Robotics.

Van Wynsberghe has been working in the field of robotics since 2004, beginning her career as a research assistant at CSTAR (Canadian Surgical Technologies and Advance Robotics). From 2014 to 2017 she was an assistant professor at the University of Twente, where her work focused on robot ethics, before being appointed as associate professor in ethics and technology at Delft University of Technology. She was the first woman to be awarded an Alexander von Humboldt Professorship for "Applied Ethics of Artificial Intelligence" in 2020 and moved to Bonn, Germany to take on the directorship of Bonn University's Institute of Science and Ethics and set up the Bonn Sustainable AI Lab.

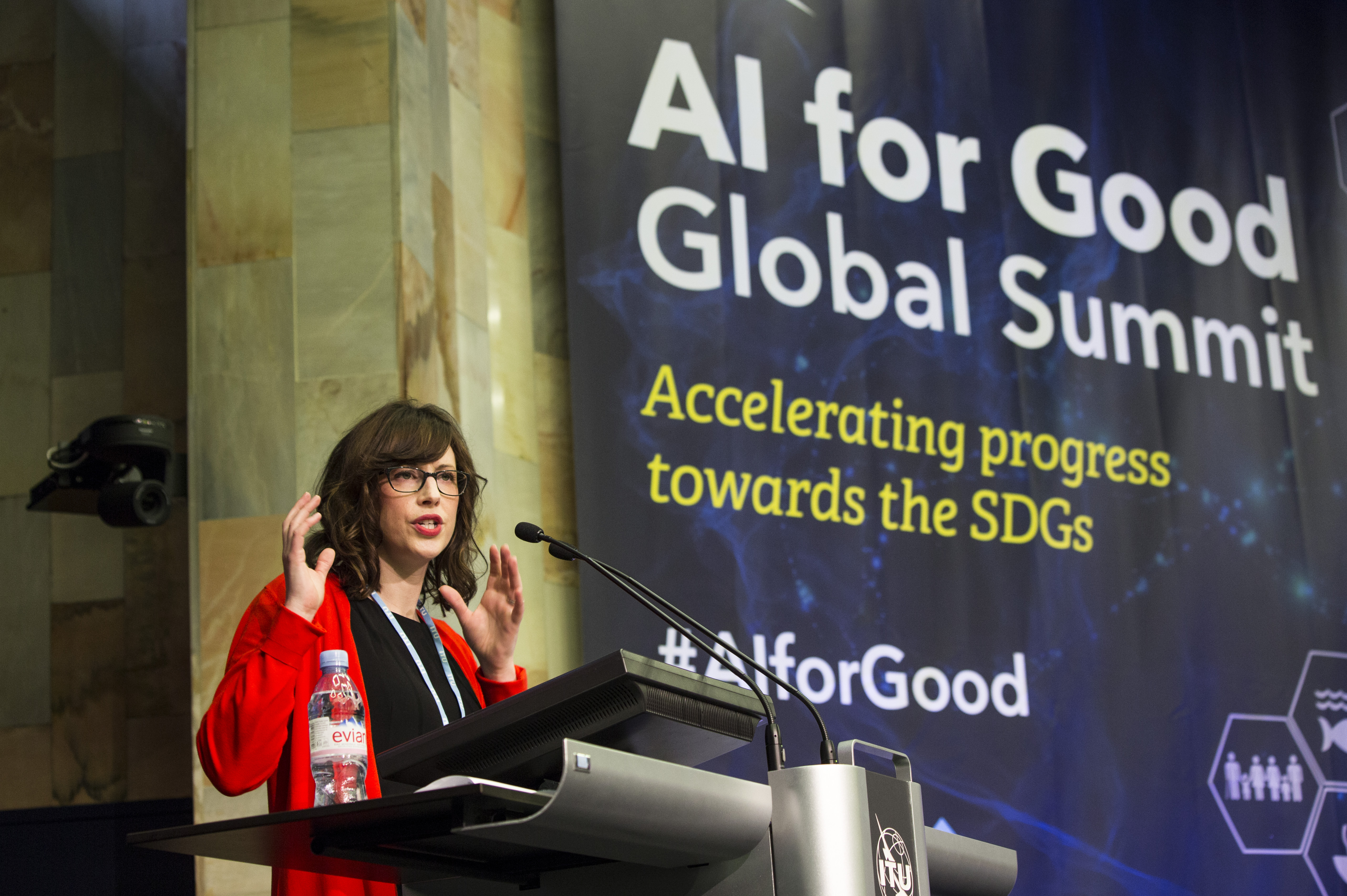
At the AI for Good Global Summit in 2018

In 2015, van Wynsberghe and Noel Sharkey established the Foundation for Responsible Robotics (FRR), a not-for-profit, non-governmental organization that advocates for the ethical design and production of robots. In founding the FRR, van Wynsberghe and Sharkey cited the urgent need for a greater level of accountability and attention to ethics in the design of robots, especially those that complete jobs through automation. She is the president of the foundation, organizing multi-stakeholder workshops; writing and disseminating consultation documents and reports; establishing public-private partnerships; and addressing legislative bodies within the European Union.

Van Wynsberghe is also a member of several organizations focusing on the ethics of technology. She has been appointed to the European Commission's High-Level Expert Group on Artificial Intelligence (AI HLG) and is on the board of the Institute for Accountability in the Digital Age and the Netherlands Alliance for AI (ALLAI Netherlands). She is on the advisory board of the AI & Intelligent Automation Network.

=== Academic contributions ===
According to Google Scholar, van Wynsberghe's work has been cited over 3800 times and currently holds an h-index of 26. She is the author of the 2016 book Healthcare Robots: Ethics, Design and Implementation, which addresses the current and future role of robots in the healthcare sector and the need to impose ethical guidelines on their use.

=== Awards and honors ===
Van Wynsberghe was a 2015 recipient of an NWO Veni Personal Research Grant to study the ethical design of care robots. In 2017, van Wynsberghe appeared on Robohub's "25 Women in Robotics You Need to Know About" list. In July 2018 she was listed among the British Interactive Media Association's "100 Ai Influencers Worth Following". Van Wynsberghe was a 2018 recipient of the Dutch L’Oréal – UNESCO For Women in Science Fellowship. She was awarded an Alexander von Humboldt Professorship for Applied Ethics of Artificial Intelligence in 2020. Since 2022, Aimee van Wynsberghe has been a member of the Akademie der Wissenschaften und der Literatur in Mainz and advisory board of the Konrad Zuse Schools of Excellence in Artificial Intelligence (DAAD). Her project "Desirable Digitalisation. Rethinking AI for Just and Sustainable Futures", in collaboration with the University of Cambridge, is funded by Stiftung Mercator with 3.8 million euro.

=== Media ===
In January 2018, van Wynsberghe was interviewed for a Raddington Report article entitled “Robot Ethics, Robot Equality.” In June 2018 she was featured on BBC's Today program and was interviewed by Seth Adler at the Artificial Intelligence & Intelligent Automation Network. Van Wynsberghe has spoken at major international events including Web Summit, the European Investment Bank Global Investment Forum, AI for Good's Global Summit, and the Economist's Innovation Summit. Van Wynsberghe was interviewed for the 2017 VPRO documentary Robo Sapiens, which discusses humankind's future with robots. In 2019 she was interviewed by Forbes where she discussed the challenges of embedding ethical frameworks into artificial intelligence systems. Aimee van Wynsberghe was featured in Forbes' 2020 list of women leading the 21st-century AI movement due to her significant contributions to the ethics of artificial intelligence.
