= Oliver D. Doleski =

German economist

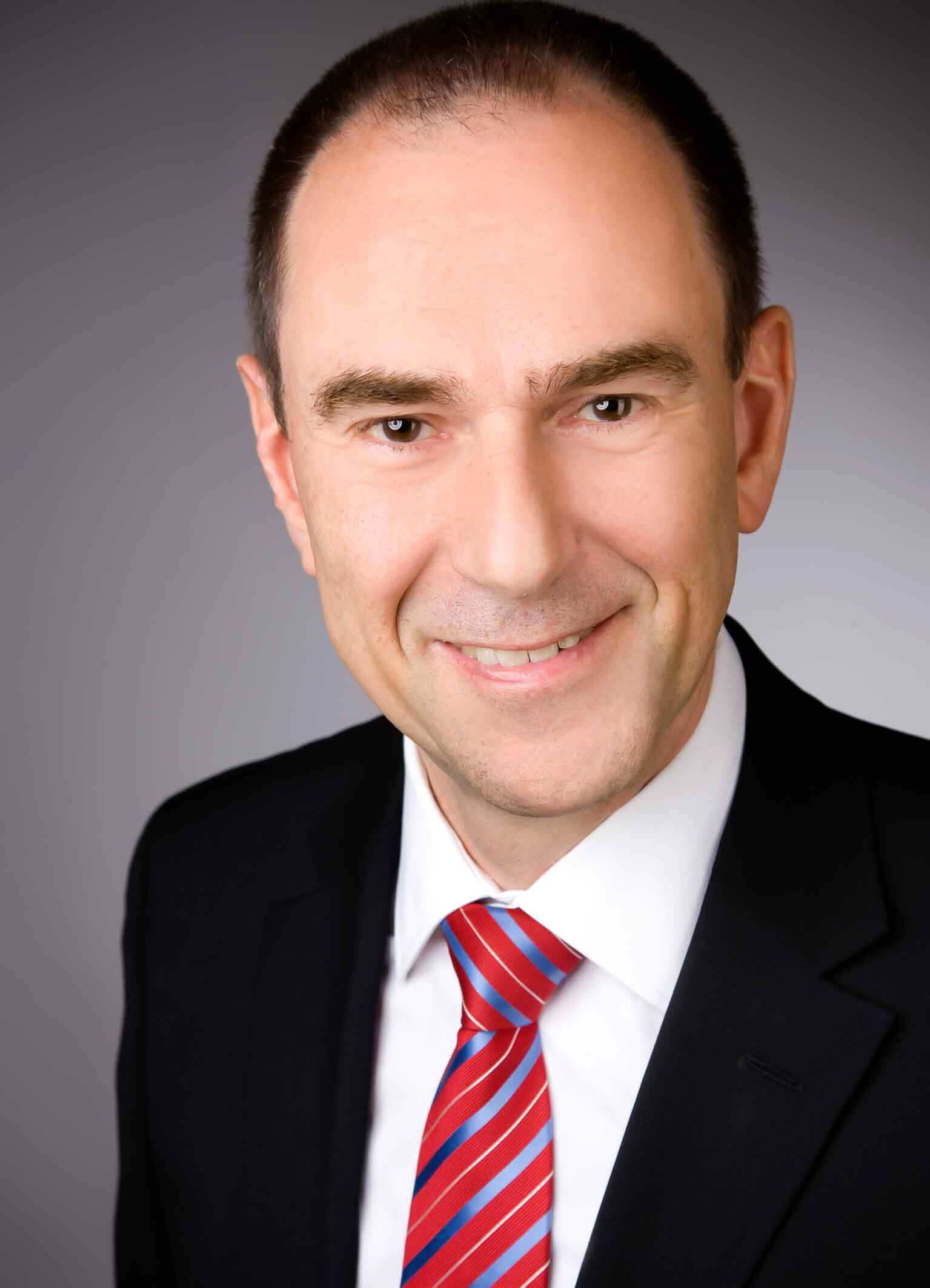
- Born: 1967 (age 58–59); Kassel
- Occupation: Author
- Known for: Utility 4.0

Oliver D. Doleski (born August 15, 1967) is a German economist, author and management consultant.

== Life ==
Doleski was born in Kassel. He studied economics at the University of the Bundeswehr Munich. He has worked in the public sector and as a management consultant in the areas of corporate management and process management, among others with his own consulting firm Fiduiter. This company is inactive since 2019.

As an author, he has published numerous articles and books.

== Contents and research ==
=== Integrated business model iOcTen ===
Doleski developed the integrated business model iOcTen, which is based on the St. Gallen management model. It helps to structure complex connections and integrate all relevant influences and restrictions into a business context. Through five interlocking components iOcTen helps to break down complex connections and processes into small, manageable analysis and work packages. In contrast to other business models, iOcTen takes the normative framework into account and integrates elements such as laws, standards, principles and culture, ensuring that even seemingly unimportant aspects are included and no essential content is forgotten. A five-phase development path helps decision makers to identify potential weaknesses of their planned business model early on and to find solutions.

Furthermore, Doleski's research focuses on the areas of smart markets, transformation of the energy industry and Internet of things.

=== Utility 4.0 ===
In 2013, Doleski developed the term Utility 4.0 for innovative energy supply companies. The number 4 stands for a fourth epochal leap in the energy sector: after allocation (Utility 1.0), supply (Utility 2.0) and service (Utility 3.0) comes digitization. The term is not only influenced by the historical division into four phases by the terms Industry 1.0 – 4.0, but also picks up on the discussion about digitalization as the fourth industrial revolution in the production economy under the term Industry 4.0 and transfers it to the energy industry. In 2016, the booklet Utility 4.0 – Transformation from Utility to Digital Energy Services was published by Springer Publishing as one of the first publications on the digital transformation of the energy sector. This was followed in 2017 by the book Herausforderung Utility 4.0 – Wie sich die Energiewirtschaft im Zeitalter der Digitalisierung verändert and finally in 2020 by the double volume Realisierung Utility 4.0.

== Publications ==
=== Author or editor ===
- Doleski, O. D., and Freunek, M. (Ed.): Handbook of Electrical Power Systems: Energy Technology and Management in Dialogue, Berlin, Boston: De Gruyter, 2024. doi:10.1515/9783111264271.
- Doleski, O. D.: Utility 4.0 – Transformation from Being a Utility to Being a Digital Energy Services Company, Ahrensburg: tredition, 2024.
- Doleski, O. D., and Freunek, M. (Ed.): Handbuch elektrische Energieversorgung: Energietechnik und Wirtschaft im Dialog, Berlin, Boston: De Gruyter Oldenbourg, 2022. doi:10.1515/9783110753585.
- Doleski, O. D.; Kaiser, T.; Metzger, M.; Niessen, S.; Thiem, S.: Digital Decarbonization: Achieving Climate Targets with a Technology-Neutral Approach, Springer Vieweg, Wiesbaden, 2022, doi:10.1007/978-3-658-33330-0 .(German: Doleski, O. D.; Kaiser, T.; Metzger, M.; Niessen, S.; Thiem, S.: Digitale Dekarbonisierung: Technologieoffen die Klimaziele erreichen, Springer Vieweg, Wiesbaden 2021.)
- Doleski, O. D. (Ed.): Realisierung Utility 4.0 Band 1: Praxis der digitalen Energiewirtschaft von den Grundlagen bis zur Verteilung im Smart Grid, Springer Vieweg, Wiesbaden, 2020.
- Doleski, O. D. (Ed.): Realisierung Utility 4.0 Band 2: Praxis der digitalen Energie-wirtschaft vom Vertrieb bis zu innovativen Energy Services, Wiesbaden: Springer Vieweg, 2020.
- Kaiser, T. and Doleski, O. D.: Advanced Operations: Best Practices for the Focused Establishment of Transformational Business Models, Wiesbaden: Springer Vieweg, 2020, doi:10.1007/978-3-658-27585-3. (German: Kaiser, T. and Doleski, O. D.: Advanced Operations: Best Practices zur fokussierten Etablierung transformatorischer Geschäftsmodelle, essentials, Wiesbaden: Springer Gabler, 2017.)
- Schallmo, D., Herbort, V., Doleski, O. D.: Roadmap Utility 4.0: Strukturiertes Vorgehen für die digitale Transformation in der Energiewirtschaft, essentials, Wiesbaden: Springer Vieweg, 2017.
- Doleski, O. D. (Ed.): Herausforderung Utility 4.0: Wie sich die Energiewirtschaft im Zeitalter der Digitalisierung verändert, Wiesbaden: Springer Vieweg, 2017.
- Doleski, O. D.: Utility 4.0: Transformation vom Versorgungs- zum digitalen Energiedienstleistungsunternehmen, essentials, Wiesbaden: Springer Vieweg, 2016.
- Doleski, O. D.: Integrated Business Model: Applying the St. Gallen Management Concept to Business Models, essentials, Springer Gabler, Wiesbaden, 2015, doi:10.1007/978-3-658-09698-4. (German: Doleski, O. D.: Integriertes Geschäftsmodell: Anwendung des St. Galler Management-Konzepts im Geschäftsmodellkontext, essentials, Wiesbaden: Gabler, 2014.)
- Doleski, O. D. and Lorenz, K. (Ed.): Energie der Alpen: Grundlagen und Zusammenhänge nachhaltiger Energieversorgung in der Alpenregion, essentials, Wiesbaden: Springer Vieweg.
- Aichele, C. and Doleski, O. D. (Ed.): Smart Market: vom Smart Grid zum intelligenten Energiemarkt, Wiesbaden: Springer Vieweg, 2014.
- Aichele, C. and Doleski, O. D. (Ed.): Smart Meter Rollout: Praxisleitfaden zur Ausbringung intelligenter Zähler, Wiesbaden: Springer Vieweg, 2013.
- Doleski, O. D.: Geschäftsprozesse der liberalisierten Energiewirtschaft. In: Aichele, C.: Smart Energy: Von der reaktiven Kundenverwaltung zum proaktiven Kundenmanagement (S. 115–150), Wiesbaden: Springer Vieweg, 2012.

== See also ==
- Internet of things
- Integrated Management Concept
