= Genome Canada =

Canadian funding body

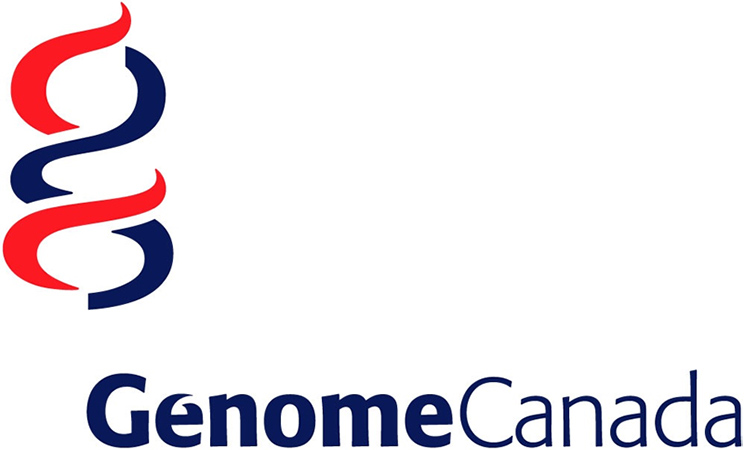
- Formation: February 8, 2000; 26 years ago
- Type: Federally funded not-for-profit organization
- Headquarters: 150 Metcalfe Street Ottawa, Ontario K2P 1P1 Canada
- President and CEO: Rob Annan
- Budget: C$40 million (approximately) (2023-2024)
- Staff: 20
- Website: www.genomecanada.ca

Genome Canada is a non-profit organization that aims to use genomics-based technologies to improve the lives of Canadians. It is funded by the Government of Canada. Genome Canada provides large-scale investments that develop new technologies, connect the public sector with private industry, and create solutions to problems of national interest, such as health, sustainable resources, the environment, and energy.

Between 2000 and 2017, Genome Canada provided C$1.5 billion Canadian dollars in genomics funding, which has attracted an additional C$2.1 billion in co-funding from partners in the private, public and non-profit sectors within Canada and internationally. On its website, it reports 20 staff (2025). Funding expenses in 2023-2024 were approximately C$40 million.

The President and CEO of Genome Canada is Rob Annan. The Chair of the Board of Directors is Bonnie Schmidt.

== History ==
Following the progress of the international Human Genome Project in the 1990s, Genome Canada was established on February 8, 2000, with a mandate to build Canada’s technological and human capacity in genomics. The distributed approach with six regional centres and the GE^{3}LS program were integral from the beginning.

The most recent five-year evaluation by Innovation, Science and Economic Development Canada was published in June 2020 with recommendations for efficiency gains and to minimize duplications.

On the 25-years anniversary of Genome Canada, a C$175-million Canadian Genomics Strategy was announced.

The corporate 2025-2030 Strategic Direction lists these four imperatives:

1. Strengthening national sovereignty
2. Enhancing economic security
3. Safeguarding environmental sustainability
4. Ensuring inclusivity in genomics

=== Presidents ===
- Martin Godbout (Founding president and CEO; 2000–2009)
  - Cindy Bell (Interim; March–October 2009)
  - Dale Patterson (Interim; October 2009–October 2010)
- Pierre Meulien (October 2010–July 2015)
  - Cindy Bell (Interim; July 2015–January 2016)
- Marc LePage (January 2016–January 2020)
- Rob Annan (January 2020–current)

== Governance ==
Genome Canada was established under the Canada Corporations Act in 2000 and, in 2012, was issued new Articles of Continuance under the Canada Not-for-Profit Corporations Act. It is governed by a Board of Directors of up to 16 individuals from the academic, private, and public sectors. The board has a permanent Science and Industry Advisory Committee (SIAC).

Every five years, Genome Canada undertakes a summative evaluation. These five-year reports as well as the audit reports are public.

== Regional genome centres ==
Genome Canada was created as six independent regional genome centres which are supported by headquarters in the Nation's Capital, Ottawa. Arranged geographically from West to East, the six centres (and the cities in which their administrative centres are located) are:

- Genome British Columbia (Vancouver)
- Genome Alberta (Calgary, Edmonton)
- Genome Prairie (Saskatoon, Winnipeg)
- Ontario Genomics (Toronto)
- Génome Québec (Montréal)
- Genome Atlantic (Halifax)

== GE^{3}LS: Ethical, environmental, economic, legal and social aspects ==
Genome Canada also funds research on the ethical, environmental, economic, legal and social aspects of genomics, which they call GE^{3}LS (the same research direction is called ELSI or ELSA in the United States and in Europe, respectively). This includes topics such as genetic privacy and genetic discrimination, as well as public acceptance of genetically modified organisms.

== Controversies ==
In 2009, Genome Canada made international science news when it withdrew approximately C$18 million from the International Regulome Consortium. This happened in the broader context of a decline in funding under the administration of Stephen Harper, Canadian Prime Minister from 2006-2015.

== See also ==
- Canada Foundation for Innovation (CFI)
- Natural Sciences and Engineering Research Council (NSERC)
- Canadian Institutes for Health Research (CIHR)
- Social Sciences and Humanities Research Council (SSHRC)
