= Ethics and Information Technology =

- Discipline: Computer science, moral philosophy
- Language: English
- Edited by: Jeroen van den Hoven

Publication details
- History: 1999–present
- Publisher: Springer Science+Business Media
- Frequency: Quarterly
- Impact factor: 1.500 (2016)

Standard abbreviations
- ISO 4: Ethics Inf. Technol.

Indexing
- CODEN: EITHFJ
- ISSN: 1388-1957 (print); 1572-8439 (web)
- LCCN: sn99048894
- OCLC no.: 42731801

Links
- Journal homepage; Online archive

Ethics and Information Technology is a quarterly peer-reviewed scientific journal covering the intersection between moral philosophy and the field of information and communications technology. It was established in 1999 by Jeroen van den Hoven (Delft University of Technology), who has been its editor-in-chief ever since. It is published by Springer Science+Business Media.

According to the Journal Citation Reports, the journal has a 2022 impact factor of 3.6. It is thus ranked #8 out of 57 journals within the category of Ethics. However, according to another metric, the TQCC (top quartile citation count), Ethics and Information Technology is ranked #1 in that category as of early 2024.
