= Jeroen van den Hoven =

Dutch ethicist and philosophy professor

- Born: 1957 (age 68–69)
- Occupations: Professor of Ethics and Technology at Delft University of Technology
- Website: https://www.jeroenvandenhoven.nl/

Jeroen van den Hoven (born 1957 in Rotterdam) is a Dutch ethicist and a philosophy professor at Delft University of Technology. He specializes in ethics of information technology.

== Work ==
Van den Hoven has written and worked with a range of scholars including Seumas Miller, Thomas Pogge, Martha Nussbaum and John Weckert.

Currently he is Scientific Director of the Delft Design for Values Institute, editor in chief of Ethics and Information Technology, and the founding Scientific Director of the 3TU.Centre for Ethics and Technology (2007-2013). Van den Hoven is also founding Chair of the CEPE conference (Computer Ethics Philosophical Enquiry), a permanent member of the European Group on Ethics (EGE) to the European Commission.

== Awards ==
- In 2009, he won the World Technology Award for Ethics as well as the IFIP prize for ICT and Society for his work in Ethics and ICT.
- In 2017 he was knighted in the Order of the Netherlands Lion

== Selected publications ==
- Van den Hoven, MJ (2005). Moral values, design and ICT. Tijdschrift voor Humanistiek, 23(oktober),52-58. (TUD)
- Van den Hoven, MJ (2005). Design for values and values for design. Informationage, 7(2), 4-7. (TUD)
- Wiegel, V., Van den Hoven M.J., Lokhorst G.J. ( 2005). Privacy, deontic epistemic action logic and software agents, an executable approach to modeling moral constraints in complex informational relationships. Ethics Inf Technol 7(4):251–264.
- Van den Hoven, J. (2008). Moral Methodology and Information Technology. In: Kennet E. Himma, Herman T. Tavani (Eds.): The Handbook of Information and Computer Ethics. Wiley, 2008, pp. 49–68.
- Van den Hoven, M.j., Manders, N.L.J.L. (2009). Value-sensitive design. In JK Berg Olsen, SA Pedersen&V Hendricks (Eds.), A companion to the philosophy of technology (pp. 477–480). Chichester: Wiley-Blackwell. (TUD)
- Van den Hoven, J. (2010). The use of normative theories in computer ethics. In: The Cambridge Handbook of Information and Computer Ethics, Cambridge University Press.
- Hoven, Jeroen van den, and John Weckert, eds. 2008. Information Technology and Moral Philosophy, Cambridge Studies in Philosophy and Public Policy. Cambridge: Cambridge University Press.
- van den Hoven, M.J. 2005. E-Democracy, E-Contestation and the Monitoral Citizen. Ethics and Information Technology, 51-59.
- van den Hoven, M.J. 2005. Privacy. In Encyclopedia of Science, Technology and Ethics, edited by C. Mitcham. New York: Macmillan Reference.
- Van den Hoven, Miller & Pogge (eds.) 2017. Designing in Ethics, Cambridge University Press. ISBN 9780511844317
- van den Hoven, M.J., Cocking Dean. 2018. Evil Online, Wiley-Blackwell. ISBN 9781405154369
