= Genetic discrimination =

Discrimination based on specific gene mutations

Genetic discrimination occurs when people treat others (or are treated) differently because they have or are perceived to have a gene mutation(s) that causes or increases the risk of an inherited disorder. It may also refer to any and all discrimination based on the genotype of a person rather than their individual merits, including that related to race, although the latter would be more appropriately included under racial discrimination. Some legal scholars have argued for a more precise and broader definition of genetic discrimination: "Genetic discrimination should be defined as when an individual is subjected to negative treatment, not as a result of the individual's physical manifestation of disease or disability, but solely because of the individual's genetic composition." Genetic Discrimination is considered to have its foundations in genetic determinism and genetic essentialism, and is based on the concept of genism, i.e. distinctive human characteristics and capacities are determined by genes.

Genetic discrimination takes different forms depending on the country and the protections that have been taken to limit genetic discrimination, such as GINA in the United States that protects people from being barred from working or from receiving healthcare as a result of their genetic makeup. The umbrella of genetic discrimination includes the notion of informed consent, which refers to an individual's right to make a decision about their participation in research with complete comprehension of the research study.

Within the United States, genetic discrimination is an ever-evolving concept that remains prominent across different domains. Emerging technology such as direct-to-consumer genetic tests have allowed for broad genetic health information to be more accessible to the public but raises concerns about privacy. In addition, the COVID-19 pandemic has exacerbated difficulties of those with genetic conditions as they have faced discrimination within the U.S. healthcare system.

The idea of genetic discrimination has been combated since the 1947 Nuremberg Code that was created shortly after WWII, during which thousands of racialized and disabled victims died in tests conducted in Germany. Since then, new issues of racialized genetic discrimination have come to light involving sharing of genetic information to genomic biobanks and subsequent novel treatments. Many countries are still developing policies to combat genetic discrimination in science, law, and everyday life.

== Legal status ==
=== United States ===
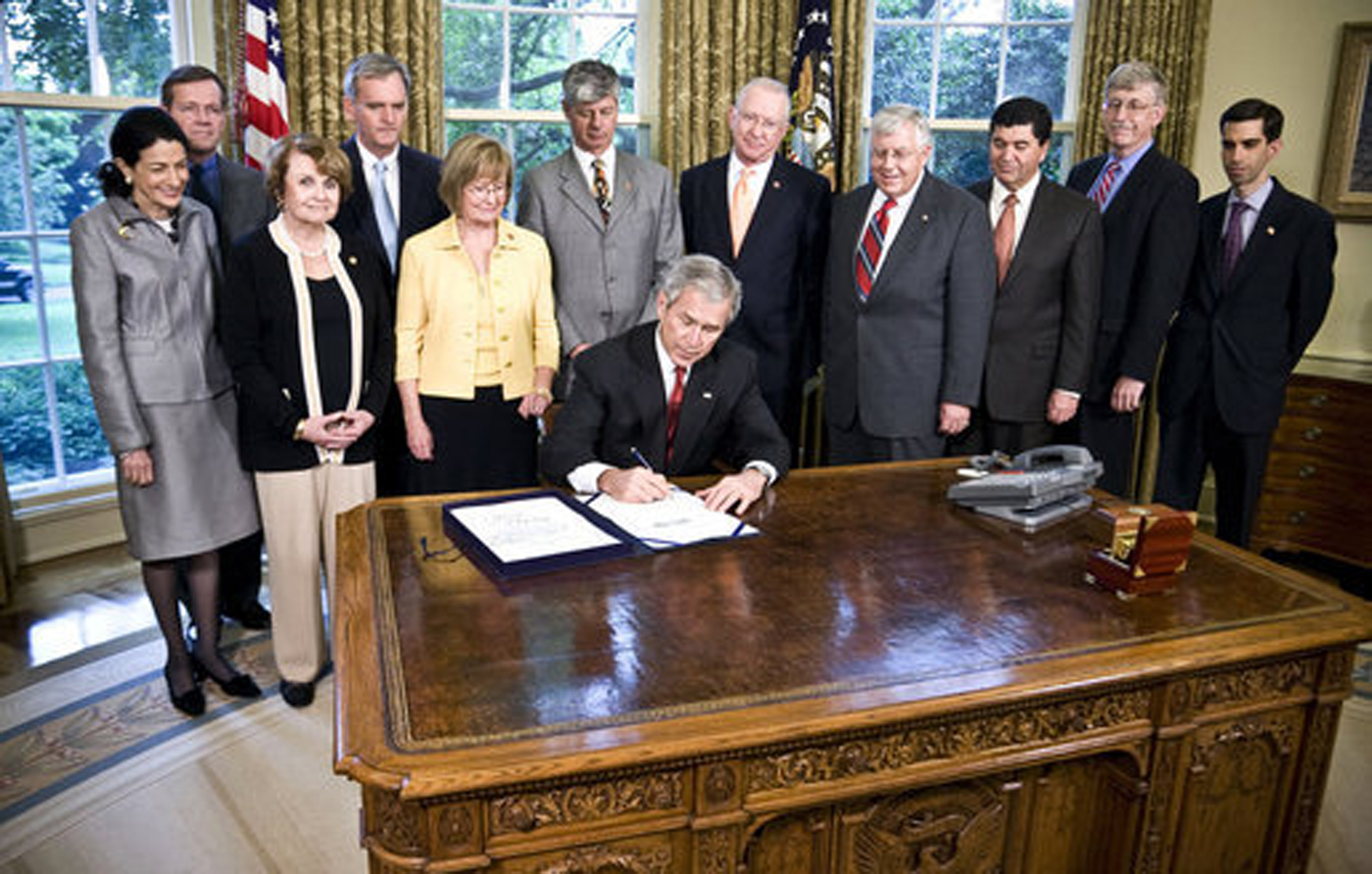
On May 21, 2008, George W. Bush signed the Genetic Information Nondiscrimination Act, protecting individuals from genetic discrimination in health insurance and employment.

There are multiple legal protections in place in the United States, such as Genetic Information Nondiscrimination Act (GINA), the Americans with Disabilities Act (ADA), and the Affordable Care Act (ACA), which all help to prevent genetic discrimination in the workplace, public services, and provide some insurance protection. Therefore, by law, those with genetic conditions are protected from possible discrimination and have a right to receive equitable care.

Genetic discrimination is illegal in the U.S. after passage of the Genetic Information Nondiscrimination Act (GINA) on May 21, 2008. It was signed into law by President George W. Bush, and passed in the US Senate by a vote of 95–0 and in the House of Representatives by 414–1. The legislation bars employers from using individuals' genetic information when making hiring, firing, job placement, or promotion decisions. GINA also protects individuals from genetic discrimination in healthcare; however, GINA itself does not define what genetic information is, leaving it up for debate. Prior to the 2008 GINA Act, individuals could be denied insurance, either partially or fully, based on genetic tests they had received.

Although it was passed in 2008 there were 201 cases that cited GINA in 2010 and 333 in 2014. It was not until 2013 that a company actually faced penalties under GINA.

==== Health insurance discrimination ====
In 2008, The New York Times reported that some individuals avoid genetic testing out of fear that it will would impede their ability to purchase insurance or find a job. They also reported that evidence of actual discrimination was rare. In November 2016 insurance company GWG Life was found to be collecting saliva samples in order to offer lower rates to people who are epigenetically healthier than others of their age. While this is positive discrimination, this does suggest future potential classification of clients by genetic data.

While the 2008 GINA Act does protect against genetic discrimination pertaining to health insurance, it does not protect against genetic discrimination under other forms of insurance, such as life, disability or long-term care insurance. Therefore, patients are enjoying less protection against genetic discrimination in comparison with other peer countries, such as France, Switzerland, Australia and the United Kingdom. Additionally, 2008 GINA offers no protection for home/mortgage insurance or when an employer has 15 or less employees. Excluded from the Act are also parties who are covered under Veterans Health Administration or Indian Health Services. Because a variety of medical tests serve as proxies for genetic information, proponents of insurer access to genetic information argue that it does not require specific limiting legislation. However, this represents an important problem for recruiting participants to medical research according to other scholars stressing that protecting American against discrimination may only happen with the advent of a voluntary moratorium by the insurance industry.

==== Direct-to-consumer genetic testing ====
===== Background =====
Direct-to-consumer genetic testing was first offered in 1997 by GeneTree, a now defunct family history website. A genetic test is considered a direct-to-consumer test if it is presented to the consumer separate from a health care provider. These tests are easily accessible on the market and popularized by companies such as 23andMe and Ancestry.com. These genetic kits are expensive and disproportionately serve wealthy individuals. As a result, when the data collected from testing is sold to research companies, it represents a biased sample of the population. The Food and Drug Administration additionally halted all 23andMe marketing in 2013 over unsubstantiated claims 23andMe made regarding disease diagnosis and prevention. After an investigation, the FDA approved 23andMe to begin carrier screening in 2015 and to resume genetic health risk screening in 2017. This has led the way for an expansion of the market of direct-to-consumer genetic tests.

===== Controversy =====
The shortage of knowledge about and awareness of direct-to-consumer genetic testing is one of the contributors to the previously limited purchasing of this kind of service. As technology has progressed, genetic testing has become a more wide scale practice, potentially affecting the privacy of consumers as a result. While some providers of DTC testing destroy the samples after giving the consumer their data, others keep the samples for future data use. The way in which samples that are sent to DTC genetic testing companies are used after analysis is an important point of ethical controversy, as many worry that the creation of biobanks form DTC data creates increased possibility for genetic discrimination. Genomic information is playing an increasingly important role in medical practice and progress. As DTC companies continue to grow, a large obstacle they face is creating a sense of trust with the public in promising to uphold nondiscrimination standards as consumer health data is not currently regulated. Some argue that the clinical utility of results from DTC tests is extremely limited and thus the risk of genetic discrimination is not worth the utility of DTC tests. However, DTC companies argue that the lack of regulation for these companies equip them for a unique position to provide important health related data for contributions to personalized medicine.

One current example of this ethical controversy was demonstrated in the 2018 announcement of 23andMe's partnership with the pharmaceutical company GlaxoSmithKline. In this deal, GlaxoSmithKline purchased a $300 million stake in 23andMe and in return 23andMe would allow the pharmaceutical company access to its biobank of genomic data for their pharmaceutical research. While these companies made this announcement in celebration of the opportunity for progress in pharmacogenomics and drug development, others were wary of the possible breaches of privacy that selling customer's personal genomic data may entail. Privacy concerns include incidental data sharing to third-party companies, such as insurance companies or employers. Privacy concerns with genetic information also extend to family members of DTC customers, having similar genetic make-up to their family member who did consent to data sharing, although these individuals did not consent themselves. GINA protects against genetic discrimination in health insurance and employment; however, there are circumstances of exception. For example, GINA does not protect individuals from genetic discrimination in life insurance, disability insurance, and long-term care or employees in companies with fewer than 15 individuals or in the military. DTC companies are not regulated in the same way as physician genetic testing and the disclaimers of data sharing in DTC companies is not as clear as medical biobanks, such as the All of Us project sponsored by the NIH. However, this does not necessarily mean that the intentions of DTC companies are nefarious. According to a qualitative study published in the Journal of Personalized Medicine, these companies can prevent the feared genetic discrimination from privacy breaches by advocating for updated policy to regulate data privacy and being intentional about only sharing genetic information to sources who intend to contribute to medical discovery with the appropriate ethical standards.

==== Genetic discrimination during COVID-19 ====
COVID-19, or a coronavirus labeled SARS-CoV-2, is a highly-transmittable, respiratory virus first identified in Wuhan, China, in December 2019. The virus' global spread caused the COVID-19 pandemic. Some research suggests that genetic conditions are among the causes of co-morbid conditions that lead to more severe COVID-19 symptoms, such as death.

Early in the pandemic, many regions experienced shortages of medical resources like PPE and ventilators. Due to the high volume of COVID-19 cases, hospital systems enacted triage protocols to direct the use of limited resources. Some hospitals were accused of enacting discriminatory triage protocols which excluded those with genetic conditions, such as in Tennessee, where those with spinal muscular atrophy, an autosomal recessive disease, or other disabilities were prevented from receiving ventilators or other scarce resources. In other states, like Washington and Alabama, hospitals were accused of broader discriminatory allocation policies which prevented larger groups of individuals with genetic conditions under categorizations of chronic conditions or intellectual disabilities from receiving life-saving treatments, such as ventilators. Many advocacy groups raised complaints about these triage protocols to the Department of Health and Human Services Office of Civil Rights, and after the complaints the guidelines were removed.

Some commentators point to these instances as evidence that there are gaps among existent legal protections, like GINA, which may leave room for discrimination in long-term care and disability insurance, or the ADA, which more so covers ongoing disabilities, rather than susceptibility to conditions. Additionally conversations have turned to how to protect DNA and genetic privacy during a pandemic like COVID-19. According to Hollenstein et al., in a preprint of their research on preserving genetic privacy, they address the possible issue of mass-scale detections and numerous samples being collected through COVID-19 tests and contact-tracing and what that means in terms of who then has access or owns this genetic information. While the exact solutions or changes to be made remain unknown, some solutions could possibly arise from research into equity-first preemption frameworks, which could help eliminate inequities in access to proper healthcare.

=== Canada ===
The Genetic Non-Discrimination Act received Royal Assent and became law in Canada on May 4, 2017. It introduced amendments to the Canadian Human Rights Act and Canada Labour Code that prohibit genetic discrimination in employment and accommodations within federally regulated industries, and also introduced criminal penalties for entities requiring individuals to undergo genetic testing as a condition for the provision of goods or services, or as a condition for entering or continuing a contract. The Act also forbids anyone from refusing to enter into a goods or services agreement with another person on the grounds that that person has refused to disclose the results of an already completed genetic test. Violations are punishable by fines of up CA$1 million and/or imprisonment of up to five years. Accordingly, one effect of the legislation is to prohibit insurance providers from demanding that a prospective client undergo a genetic test—or to disclose an existing test—as a prerequisite to the provision of insurance coverage.

The Genetic Non-Discrimination Act was opposed by the insurance industry and, upon its passage, then-attorney general Jody Wilson-Raybould stated she believed the law may be unconstitutional. The provisions of the law, as they applied to provincially regulated industries, were challenged by the government of Quebec before the Quebec Court of Appeal, which held them unconstitutional. On July 10, 2020, the Supreme Court of Canada reversed the decision and upheld the law in a 5–4 split ruling.

=== United Kingdom ===
The Equality Act 2010 prohibits the use of genetic information for employment decisions such as hiring and promotions. While no formal law exists banning the use of genetic information for insurance policy decisions, the Government of the United Kingdom and the Association of British Insurers voluntarily entered a moratorium from 2014 to 2019 to refrain from using genetic information with regards to insurance.

=== Malawi ===
Malawi is the only country in Africa that has enacted any laws regarding genetic discrimination. Malawi's National Health Sciences Research Committee adopted the policy requirements of the Science and Technology Act No.16 of 2003.

=== Australia ===
In Australia, genetic information is less likely to influence health insurance coverage decisions as health insurance is "community rated", meaning that all individuals pay the same amount regardless of their history or genetic makeup. However, genetic test results can be used by life insurance companies to deny cover, increase the cost of premiums, or place exclusions on cover. Since 2008, the amount of insurance applications with attached genetic test results has increased by 90%. Although the community rating for health insurance allows for a more even distribution of risk and cost to consumers, life insurance companies are legally allowed to "underwrite" when evaluating the genetic risks of applicants; essentially, those with higher risk could potentially be charged higher premiums. Life insurance companies can require individuals to report genetic testing results if they have already been tested, but cannot force individuals to take genetic tests. These companies are able to require individuals to disclose genetic testing results from research and direct-to-consumer tests.

Research in Australia demonstrated that life insurance discrimination deters people from participating in research and pursuing clinical genetic testing. In 2017, the Parliamentary Joint Committee on Corporations and Financial Services conducted an inquiry into the life insurance industry. In its 2018 report, the Committee recommended an urgent ban on the use of genetic test results by life insurers, and that the Australian government maintain a watching brief to consider whether legislation was required in future.

In 2019, the Financial Services Council, the industry body for Australian life insurers at the time, introduced a voluntary, partial, moratorium on using genetic test results for applications up to certain financial limits. The moratorium is self-regulated, with no government oversight.

In 2020, the Australian Genetics and Life Insurance Moratorium: Monitoring the Effectiveness and Response (A-GLIMMER) project was funded by the Australian Government Medical Research Futures Fund Genomics Health Futures Mission. The project was designed to evaluate the effectiveness of the moratorium in addressing genetic discrimination in Australia, from various stakeholder perspectives.

The project conducted research with consumers, health professionals, genetic researchers and financial services personnel. It also conducted a policy analysis of the moratorium compared with the recommendations made by the Parliamentary Committee in 2018, finding that the moratorium did not meet the expectations of the recommendations. The A-GLIMMER project concluded on 30 June 2023. It published its findings in a report, which found that genetic discrimination continues to occur in Australia, and continues to deter individuals from pursuing genetic testing and participating in genetic research. The report concluded that the moratorium is inadequate to address and prevent genetic discrimination in life insurance, and should be replaced with a legislative model of prohibition. The Project recommended that:

1. The Australian Government amend the Disability Discrimination Act 1992 (Cth) ('the Act') to prohibit insurers from using genetic or genomic test results to discriminate between applicants for risk-rated insurance, and consider amendments to the regulation of financial services to ensure insurers are subject to a positive duty to not discriminate.

2. The Australian Government allocate responsibility and appropriate resources to the Australian Human Rights Commission ('AHRC') to enforce, promote, educate and support individuals and all relevant stakeholders to understand and meet the new legal obligations under the Act. The AHRC should consult with a range of genetics and genomics experts and stakeholders to achieve this goal.

The Australian government is considering the recommendations in the report. The Assistant Treasurer and Minister for Financial Services, the Hon. Stephen Jones MP, made a statement that "We don't want people to avoid having genetic tests which could detect life threatening conditions because of a fear it may affect access to insurance. Early detection can lead to life saving interventions. That's in everyone's interest."

In November 2023, the Australian Labor Government held a public consultation into options for policy reform in this area. The consultation was open until January 2024. The Treasury received over 1000 submissions, over 97% of which supported a total legislative ban on genetic discrimination in life insurance.

In September 2024, the Hon. Stephen Jones MP, announced that the Labor Government would introduce a total legislative ban on the use of adverse genetic test results by life insurers in underwriting. The Minister stated at the press conference, "Our aim is to have legislation in the parliament this term. We want to see this operating as soon as possible. But can I add to that by saying it is my expectation that most if not all players within the industry will move on a voluntary basis to ensure that these provisions are operating in the context that they offer from here on in. The Council of Australian Life Insurers (CALI) the current life insurance industry body, joined the press conference and publicly stated its support for the introduction of the legislation.

The legislation was not introduced (or drafted) in the Federal Parliament's 47th term, despite bipartisan support, and the life insurance industry did not move to honour the announced provisions on a voluntary basis. The Government was criticised by the Federal Opposition and members of the independent cross-bench for failing to introduce legislation as promised within the parliamentary term.

In February 2025, the Labor Government released a second consultation paper on technical aspects of the design of the legislative ban. The consultation closed in March 2025. A joint submission led by the lead investigators of the A-GLIMMER project at Monash University was endorsed by over 100 community organisations, including genetic health professionals, researchers, consumer support groups, health and financial services advocacy organisations, professional member organisations and others. Signatories included the Financial Rights Legal Centre, Australian Medical Association, National Heart Foundation, Lung Foundation, Cancer Council Australia, Australian Genomics, Murdoch Children's Research Institute, the Australian Alliance for Indigenous Genomics, and others.

=== Argentina ===
Genetic discrimination is a rising issue in Argentina. Health plans discriminate against those who have disabilities or who have genetic conditions. In the past decade, however, National Law 26689 was passed providing patients with the right to not experience discrimination as a result of genetic conditions.

== Global instruments ==
The Universal Declaration on the Human Genome and Human Rights (1997), the International Declaration on Human Genetic Data (2003) and the Universal Declaration on Bioethics and Human Rights (2005) are global instruments drawn up by the International Bioethics Committee of UNESCO.

== Genetic testing in the workplace ==
Some people have genes that make them more susceptible to developing a disease as a result of an occupational exposure. For example, workers with beryllium sensitivity and chronic beryllium disease are more likely to carry the gene HLA-DPB1 than workers without these conditions. By offering optional genetic testing to workers and allowing only the workers to see their own results, employers could protect genetically susceptible individuals from certain occupational diseases. A beryllium manufacturing company initiated a pilot program to test prospective workers for the HLA-DPB1 gene at a university-based laboratory. The company paid for the testing and counseling but received results that did not identify which workers had the gene.

In 1991, the American Medical Association Council on Ethical and Judicial Affairs suggested that the following five conditions must be satisfied in order for genetic screening by an employer to be appropriate:

- The disease must develop so rapidly that monitoring would be ineffective in preventing it.
- The genetic test is highly accurate.
- The genetic variation results in an unusually elevated susceptibility to occupational illness.
- Undue expense is needed to protect susceptible workers by lowering the level of the toxic substance in the workplace.
- The worker must provide informed consent prior to being tested.

Several occupational health screening measures similar to genetic testing are already taking place. For example, in 1978, DuPont reported testing African American applicants for sickle cell trait and restricted these workers from exposure to nitro and amino compounds. However, research indicates that workers or applicants would not take advantage of genetic testing due to fear of discrimination. A 1995 poll of the general public found that over 85% are concerned about access to use of genetic information by insurers and employers. Likewise, in the case of the beryllium manufacturer described above, so few workers participated in the genetic testing that the company decided instead to pursue an "enhanced preventive model of workplace controls."

== Race ==
Some cases have found statistical evidence of genetic differences between human populations, such as mutations within the Duffy blood group. Yet research looking at 109 genetic markers across 16 populations by Guido Barbujani "does not suggest that the racial subdivision of our species reflects any major discontinuity in our genome". As genomic research continues to investigate human genetic variation on a large scale, racial genetic discrimination remains a concern for many.

=== Linking genetic conditions and treatments to race ===
State governments in the United States have attempted to combat racial discrimination by barring instances of discrimination by insurers that involve linking specific genetic conditions to race, such as the sickle cell trait in African Americans. Further, therapeutic interventions or treatments based on genetic variants associated with race can sometimes be inaccurate and lead to negative health outcomes. An example of this has been doctors prescribing an improper dosage of a drug called warfarin prescribed to African American populations, despite research disproving they require a higher dose than white populations. The medical community recognizes that genetic variants—such as predisposition to drug metabolism among others—make up only one facet of a person's health, which is also impacted by their environment and lifestyle.

=== Genetic privacy ===
In addition, many individuals are concerned with their genetic privacy and worry that they will face discrimination based on their genetic information. These worries may include loss of confidentiality, risk of information being shared with insurance providers, risk of genetic samples being used without their consent, and health-based discrimination more broadly.

==== Genomic biobanks ====
Contributing to genomic biobanks can be an additional source of concern for minority populations. Biobanks are collections of biological samples which can include blood, tissue, or DNA from many people. Despite the utility of biobanks to furthering genomic research, minority groups fear that their samples may be used improperly or even be used to strike down an entire culture. Such was the case when genetic samples were taken from the Havasupai people, a Native American tribe in Arizona. They consented for their samples to provide insight into the prevalence of diabetes in their community, but did not consent to them to investigate links to schizophrenia or provide evolutionary genetic analysis to discredit the tribe's origin beliefs. Misuse of genetic data may create long-lasting distrust towards the medical community.

=== Diversity in genomics ===
Some efforts have been made to use genetic testing for reconciliation projects involving people of African descent, which attempt to make social reparations based upon genetic genealogy. Though genetic ancestry testing can be a valuable source of information for those seeking connections to their heritage or recognize a new identity, African Americans may feel coerced into genetic testing or unknowingly face discrimination. Participants also have very little control over how their data will be used, including within the medical sphere or the criminal justice system. As such, increased circulation of genetic genealogical data may be harmful for African Americans.

As minority populations are hesitant to contribute their DNA to genomic research, there continues to be a lack of inclusive health information being disseminated and incorporated in medical treatments. Genomic research has been predominantly based upon DNA samples with European heritage, which fails to holistically and accurately describe the complexity of all people's genetics.

Other confounding factors related to diversity such as age, gender, or socioeconomic status may also influence genetic discrimination in addition to race.

== Popular culture ==
According to Jonathan Roberts and his colleagues, the media evokes irrational fear among the public about advances in genetic techniques. In a recent study, participants who were prompted to convey their attitudes about unfamiliar scientific concepts relating to genetics ultimately drew conclusions based on examples from popular culture.

Genoism is a neologism coined by Andrew Niccol, director and writer of the 1997 film Gattaca, used to describe unethical and illegal genetic discrimination. Predictions of physical and mental performance are computed via genetics from DNA collected from hair, fingernails, skin flakes, spit swabs, eyelashes, etc. Upon birth, a number of genetically induced characteristics are calculated: physical and intellectual capacity, life expectancy, probable successful diseases, and likely causes of death, all determined via blood samples and genetic testing. Job interviews, health insurance purchasing, and even potential dates can be sized up according to the perceived quality of the person's DNA due to advancements in genome sequencing. This put an ironic twist to Darwin's sexual selection for good genes. According to the movie, "We now have discrimination down to a science."

My father was right. It didn't matter how much I lied on my resume. My real resume was in my cells. Why should anybody invest all that money to train me when there were a thousand other applicants with a far cleaner profile? Of course, it's illegal to discriminate, 'genoism' it's called. But no one takes the law seriously. If you refuse to disclose, they can always take a sample from a door handle or a handshake, even the saliva on your application form. If in doubt, a legal drug test can just as easily become an illegal peek at your future in the company.

— Vincent Freeman (Ethan Hawke), Gattaca, 1997

== See also ==
- Dysgenics
- Gattaca, the most notable film about genetic discrimination
- Genetic privacy
- Human Genome Project
- Health Insurance Portability and Accountability Act
- Genetic Information Nondiscrimination Act
- Americans with Disabilities Act
- Affordable Care Act
- Genetic Discrimination Observatory
