= Integrated Management Concept =

The Integrated Management Concept or IMC is an approach to structure management challenges by applying a "system-theoretical perspective that sees organisations as complex systems consisting of sub-systems, interrelations, and functions". The most characteristic aspect of the IMC is its distinction between three particular management dimensions: normative, strategic, and operational management, which are held together by different integration mechanisms. The normative management dimension determines the general aim of the organization, the strategic dimension directs the plans, basic structures, systems, and the problem-solving behaviour of the staff for achieving it, and the operative level translates the normative missions and strategic programs into day-to-day organizational processes.

The IMC was developed by Knut Bleicher and his colleagues originally as an element of the St. Gallen Management Model, introduced in the 1970s by Hans Ulrich and Walter Krieg at the Swiss University of St. Gallen. Thereafter, the IMC has been revised several times (e.g. with respect to its application within SMEs sectors) and further developed by research institutions and management scholars, such as Johannes Rüegg-Stürm.

== Dimensions of management ==
=== Normative management ===
The normative management dimension deals with principles, norms, and strategies which are aimed to ensure the surviving capabilities of a company through the preservation of its identity. Bleicher states that "because of its constitutive role, normative management functions as the basis for all activities of management". Through vision, mission, and purpose statements, normative management codifies the norms, principles, and strategies that fulfill the company's general aim.

=== Strategic management ===
Strategic management focuses on achieving a company's competitive advantage. It utilizes the organizational experience in relation to its technologies, social structures, and processes against competitors in the market. While normative management functions as a foundation for activities, it is the task of strategic management to provide orientation for these activities.

=== Operational management ===
The operational management dimension is characterized by the processes and tasks that apply on practice the realization of organizational norms and strategies. It aims at optimizing process efficiency and effective social cooperation to enhance performance, both within the organisation and with external stakeholders. Thus, the operational management level facilitates the development of processes, products, and services.

== Integration mechanisms ==
The IMC identifies three integration mechanisms that span the management dimensions and ensure the alignment between them. These integration mechanisms are defined as meta-integration, vertical integration, and horizontal integration. Meta-integration is based on the management and business philosophy which defines the company's consideration of and relation to its stakeholders' values. Vertical integration is achieved throughout the three management dimensions by means of structures, activities, and behavior. Structures describe the translation of corporate governance into effective management and efficient processes. Activities refer to the development and application of corporate policies, strategic programmes, and operational tasks (e.g. marketing activities like acquiring customers or performing customer service). Behavior relates to defining roles that ensure that the company's culture and normative values are put into practice. Horizontal integration is about aligning the structures, activities, and behavior throughout the distinct management dimensions.

== Application ==
The IMC has been adapted in various contexts, such as foresight frameworks or cybernetic theories for organisational intelligence. More recently, it has also been used as a foundation for an Integrated Business Model Framework by Oliver D. Doleski that identifies normative, strategic, and operational business model elements. Breuer & Lüdeke-Freund adopted the basic distinction between management levels and integration mechanisms to develop a framework for values-based innovation management stressing the impact of normative orientations for research, design and management of corporate innovation. The IMC is closely related to systems approaches such as Stafford Beer's Viable Systems Model due to its systemic and cybernetic character.
