= Responsible Research and Innovation =

European Union term in its research framework

Responsible Research and Innovation (RRI) is a term used by the European Union's Framework Programmes to describe scientific research and technological development processes that take into account effects and potential impacts on the environment and society. It gained visibility around the year 2010, arising from predecessors including "ELSA" (Ethical, Legal and Social Aspects) studies prompted by the Human Genome Project. Various slightly different definitions of RRI emerged, but all of them agree that societal challenges should be a primary focus of scientific research, and moreover they agree upon the methods by which that goal should be achieved.

RRI involves holding research to high ethical standards, ensuring gender equality in the scientific community, investing policy-makers with the responsibility to avoid harmful effects of innovation, engaging the communities affected by innovation and ensuring that they have the knowledge necessary to understand the implications by furthering science education and Open Access. Organizations that adopted the RRI terminology include the Engineering and Physical Sciences Research Council.

"Horizon 2020", the European Commission's program for science funding announced in 2013, made RRI a main focus. The foundations for this were laid in the program "Societally Responsible Innovating", which was an initiative of Netherlands Organization for Scientific research and six ministerial departments in the Netherlands. The 2005-2007 preparations for this program coined the phrase "Responsible Innovation" and designed a program with several calls for proposals. The core idea of Responsible Research and Innovation in the EU Horizon 2020 Program was inspired by this program.

In 2014, it was suggested that the "broader impacts" criteria of the National Science Foundation were, despite certain dissimilarities, in effect coming to resemble RRI standards.

There are many industries and services that involve research and development and specifically highlight the need and importance of responsible research to make that development most beneficial to all of its stake holders including the society linked with it. Commercial agriculture is one such industry among others that is heavily dependent on responsible research development.

One area in which RRI principles are being applied is quantum computing. A research collaboration led by Oxford University within the UK National Quantum Technologies Programme aims to reveal how quantum computing can be socially and economically transformative, and to identify the potential downsides of the "disruption" it might bring about.

Among the criticisms voiced about RRI, prominent concerns include the vagueness of the terminology, the possibility of discouraging blue skies research and the lack of sufficient practical reward for embracing RRI in a research culture based on competition and short-term contracts.

== Measuring responsible innovation ==
Although much of the RRI literature has remained conceptual, recent a psychometric instrument is developed to measure Responsible Innovation at the organizational level. The scale provides a concrete tool for scholars and practitioners to assess the extent to which firms operationalize responsible innovation, distinguish it from related constructs like sustainability or corporate social responsibility.

== Related approaches ==
- Socio-Technical Integration Research (STIR): Socio-Technical Integration Research provides methods to embed social and ethical reflection within laboratory research settings. Through structured intervention protocols, researchers collaboratively examine assumptions, choices, and potential impacts. STIR has been used internationally as a practical approach to fostering responsible innovation in scientific practice.
- Constructive Technology Assessment: Developed primarily in the Netherlands, Constructive Technology Assessment aims to broaden technology assessment by including societal actors early in technology development. CTA facilitates reflexive processes in which stakeholders collaboratively explore the societal implications of emerging technologies. This anticipatory and participatory approach strongly influenced RRI practices.
- Value Sensitive Design: Value Sensitive Design is a theoretical and methodological approach to designing technology that systematically accounts for human values throughout the design process. VSD incorporates conceptual, empirical, and technical investigations to align technological development with ethical and social considerations. Its emphasis on integrating values aligns with RRI's objectives to ensure socially desirable and ethically acceptable innovation.
- Science, Environment, Societies: Reflective and forward-looking approaches to the roles of research, in order to integrate ethical, legal, ecological, and social dimensions into its activities or projects.

== Current status: policy shift at EU level ==
With the conclusion of Horizon 2020, Responsible Research and Innovation (RRI) is no longer presented as a standalone programme within the European Union's research and innovation policy. Instead, many of the principles associated with RRI have been integrated into broader frameworks and requirements under Horizon Europe (2021–2027).

Under Horizon Europe, RRI elements such as public engagement, open science, ethics, gender equality, and inclusivity continue to play an important role, but they are often addressed through other policy instruments and cross-cutting objectives rather than under a dedicated RRI banner. For example, open science practices and gender equality plans have become eligibility criteria for funding, and citizen engagement is promoted across various mission-oriented research activities.

Despite these changes, many networks, projects, and scholarly communities continue to refer to RRI as a framework for aligning research and innovation with societal values, needs, and expectations.
