= British Interactive Media Association =

British industry body

The British Interactive Media Association (BIMA) is a not-for-profit industry body representing the digital industry in the United Kingdom.

Formed in 1985, BIMA is a membership organisation primarily made up of digital agencies. It has offices in England, Scotland and Wales, as well as regional representatives across the UK, and a membership extending to several thousand individual digital professionals.

The organisation is run by an elected Executive Committee of 13 Members who are voted in at the AGM.

== Purpose and activities ==
BIMA's purpose is to represent the interactive media and digital content sector in the UK. Its core objectives are to promote the British digital industry, share knowledge and best practice, recognise excellence and support the next generation of digital professionals. Nationally, BIMA acts as a liaison with academia and the government, acting as a united voice for its members and aiming to drive commercial growth in the sector. Globally it champions the UK's digital industry to foster an internationally competitive industry.

== Organisation ==
BIMA typically elects a new Chair every three years, to serve in a voluntary capacity.

The current Chair is Mary Keane-Dawson. Previous Chairs include: Tarek Nseir and Natalie Gross (co-chairs) 2016 - 2019; Adam Graham 2013 - 2016; Justin Cooke 2009 - 2013; Paul Walsh 2006 - 2009.
