= Lundberg lag =

Proposed economic waves
Cycle/wave name	Period (years)
Kitchin cycle (inventory, e.g. pork cycle)	3–5
Juglar cycle (fixed investment)	7–11
Kuznets swing (infrastructural investment)	15–25
Kondratiev wave (technological basis)	45–60

The Lundberg lag, named after the Swedish economist Erik Lundberg, stresses the lag between changes in the demand and response in output. This is one lag which points out that business cycles do not follow a completely random fashion but can be explained with a few different important regularities.

== See also ==
- Robertson lag
