= Juglar =

Juglar may refer to:

- Juglar, defunct Champagne house, in 1829 merged into Jacquesson
- Juglar cycle, fixed investment cycle
- Historically, a kind of minstrel or jester in Spain

People:

- Clément Juglar (1819–1905), French doctor and statistician
