= Business cycle =

Intervals of expansion and recession in economic activity

Business cycles are intervals of general expansion followed by recession in economic performance. The changes in economic activity that characterize business cycles have important implications for the welfare of the general population, government institutions, and private sector firms.

There are many definitions of a business cycle. The simplest defines recessions as two consecutive quarters of negative GDP growth. More satisfactory classifications are provided first by including more economic indicators and second by looking for more data patterns than the two quarter definition. In the United States, the National Bureau of Economic Research oversees a Business Cycle Dating Committee that defines a recession as "a significant decline in economic activity spread across the market, lasting more than a few months, normally visible in real GDP, real income, employment, industrial production, and wholesale-retail sales."

Business cycles are usually thought of as a medium-term phenomenon. They are less related to long-term trends that arise from slowly changing factors, such as technological advances. Furthermore, a one-period change that is unusual over the course of one or two years is often regarded as noise; examples include a worker strike or an isolated period of severe weather.

The individual episodes of expansion and recession occur with varying duration and intensity over time. Typically, their periodicity ranges from about 2 to 10 years.

There are many sources of business cycle movements such as rapid and significant changes in the price of oil or variation in consumer sentiment that affects overall spending in the macroeconomy and thus investment and firms' profits. Usually such sources are unpredictable in advance and can be viewed as random shocks to the cyclical pattern, as happened during the 2008 financial crisis or the COVID-19 pandemic.

== History ==
=== Theory ===
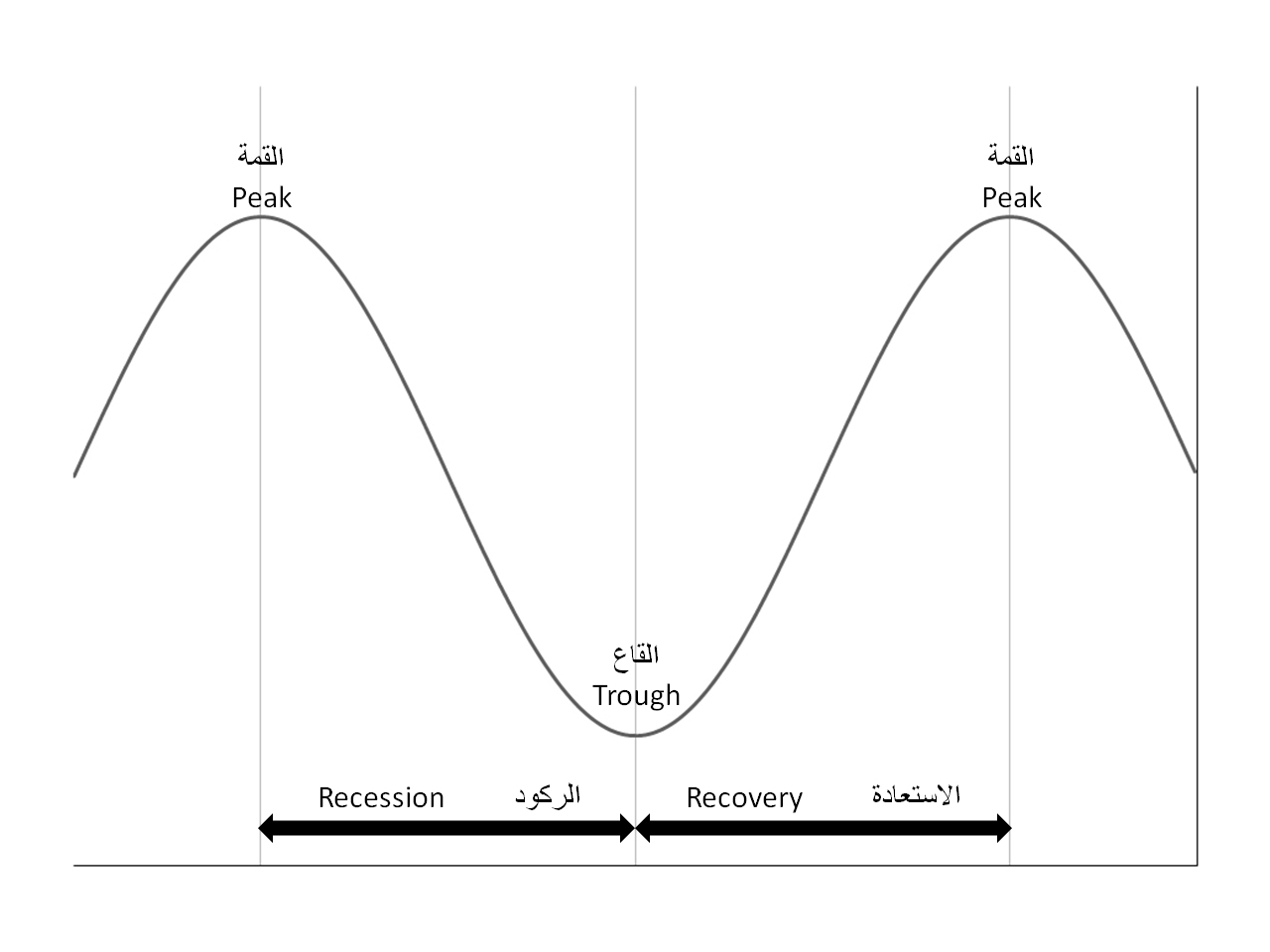
Phases of the business cycle

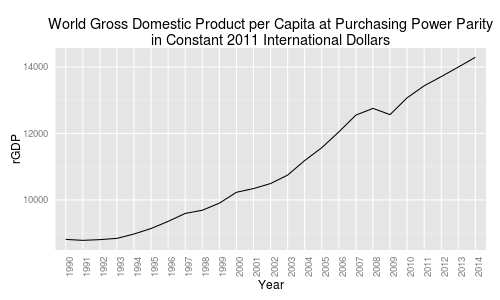
Long term growth of GDP

The first systematic exposition of economic crises, in opposition to the existing theory of economic equilibrium, was the 1819 Nouveaux Principes d'économie politique by Jean Charles Léonard de Sismondi. Prior to that point classical economics had either denied the existence of business cycles, blamed them on external factors, notably war, or only studied the long term. Sismondi found vindication in the Panic of 1825, which was the first inarguably international economic crisis, occurring in peacetime.

Sismondi and his contemporary Robert Owen, who expressed similar but less systematic thoughts in 1817 Report to the Committee of the Association for the Relief of the Manufacturing Poor, both identified the cause of economic cycles as overproduction and underconsumption, caused in particular by wealth inequality. They advocated government intervention and socialism, respectively, as the solution. This work did not generate interest among classical economists, though underconsumption theory developed as a heterodox branch in economics until being systematized in Keynesian economics in the 1930s.

Sismondi's theory of periodic crises was developed into a theory of alternating cycles by Charles Dunoyer, and similar theories, showing signs of influence by Sismondi, were developed by Johann Karl Rodbertus. Periodic crises in capitalism formed the basis of the theory of Karl Marx, who further claimed that these crises were increasing in severity and, on the basis of which, he predicted a communist revolution. Though only passing references in Das Kapital (1867) refer to crises, they were extensively discussed in Marx's posthumously published books, particularly in Theories of Surplus Value. In Progress and Poverty (1879), Henry George focused on land's role in crises – particularly land speculation – and proposed a single tax on land as a solution.

Statistical or econometric modelling and theory of business cycle movements can also be used. In this case a time series analysis is used to capture the regularities and the stochastic signals and noise in economic time series such as Real GDP or Investment. [Harvey and Trimbur, 2003, Review of Economics and Statistics] developed models for describing stochastic or pseudo- cycles, of which business cycles represent a leading case. As well-formed and compact – and easy to implement – statistical methods may outperform macroeconomic approaches in numerous cases, they provide a solid alternative even for rather complex economic theory.

=== Classification by periods ===
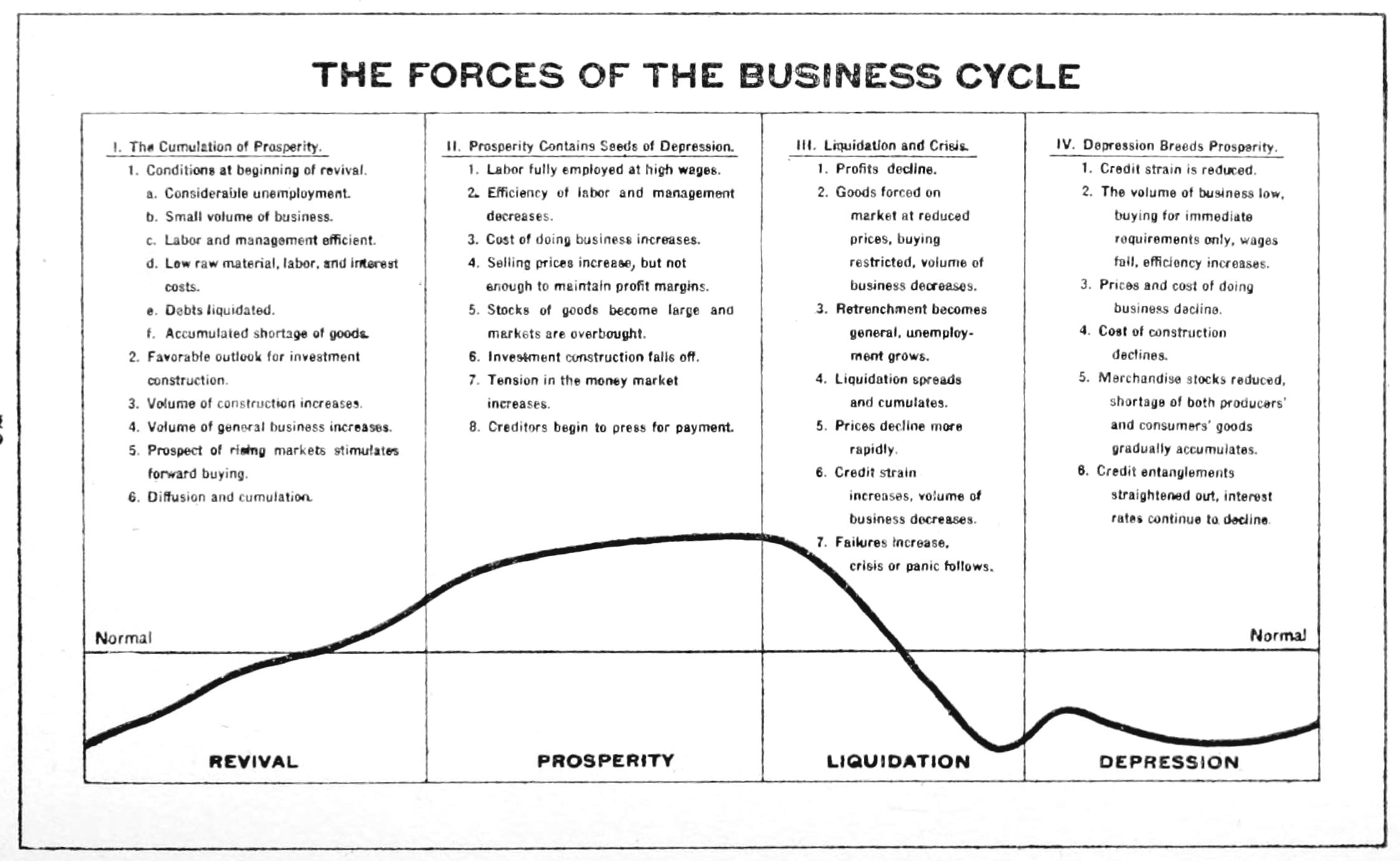
Business cycle with it specific forces in four stages according to Malcolm C. Rorty, 1922

In 1860 French economist Clément Juglar first identified economic cycles 7 to 11 years long, although he cautiously did not claim any rigid regularity. This interval of periodicity is also commonplace, as an empirical finding, in time series models for stochastic cycles in economic data. Furthermore, methods like statistical modelling in a Bayesian framework – see e.g. [Harvey, Trimbur, and van Dijk, 2007, Journal of Econometrics] – can incorporate such a range explicitly by setting up priors that concentrate around say 6 to 12 years, such flexible knowledge about the frequency of business cycles can actually be included in their mathematical study, using a Bayesian statistical paradigm.

Later, economist Joseph Schumpeter argued that a Juglar cycle has four stages:

1. Expansion (increase in production and prices, low interest rates)
2. Crisis (stock exchanges crash and multiple bankruptcies of firms occur)
3. Recession (drops in prices and in output, high interest-rates)
4. Recovery (stocks recover because of the fall in prices and incomes)

Schumpeter's Juglar model associates recovery and prosperity with increases in productivity, consumer confidence, aggregate demand, and prices.

In the 20th century, Schumpeter and others proposed a typology of business cycles according to their periodicity, so that a number of particular cycles were named after their discoverers or proposers:

Proposed economic waves
Cycle/wave name	Period (years)
Kitchin cycle (inventory, e.g. pork cycle)	3–5
Juglar cycle (fixed investment)	7–11
Kuznets swing (infrastructural investment)	15–25
Kondratiev wave (technological basis)	45–60

- The Kitchin inventory cycle of 3 to 5 years (after Joseph Kitchin)
- The Juglar fixed-investment cycle of 7 to 11 years. A range of periods rather than one fixed period is needed to capture business cycle fluctuations, which may be done by using a random or irregular source as in an econometric or statistical framework.
- The Kuznets infrastructural investment cycle of 15 to 25 years (after Simon Kuznets – also called "building cycle")
- The Kondratiev wave or long technological cycle of 45 to 60 years (after the Soviet economist Nikolai Kondratiev)

Some say interest in the different typologies of cycles has waned since the development of modern macroeconomics, which gives little support to the idea of regular periodic cycles. Further econometric studies such as the two works in 2003 and 2007 cited above demonstrate a clear tendency for cyclical components in macroeconomic times to behave in a stochastic rather than deterministic way.

Others, such as Dmitry Orlov, argue that simple compound interest mandates the cycling of monetary systems. Since 1960, World GDP has increased by fifty-nine times, and these multiples have not even kept up with annual inflation over the same period. Social Contract (freedoms and absence of social problems) collapses may be observed in nations where incomes are not kept in balance with cost-of-living over the timeline of the monetary system cycle.

The Bible (760 BCE) and Hammurabi's Code (1763 BCE) both explain economic remediations for cyclic sixty-year recurring great depressions, via fiftieth-year Jubilee (biblical) debt and wealth resets. Thirty major debt forgiveness events are recorded in history including the debt forgiveness given to most European nations in the 1930s to 1954.

=== Occurrence ===
A simplified Kondratiev wave, with the theory that productivity enhancing innovations drive waves of economic growth

There were great increases in productivity, industrial production and real per capita product throughout the period from 1870 to 1890 that included the Long Depression and two other recessions. There were also significant increases in productivity in the years leading up to the Great Depression. Both the Long and Great Depressions were characterized by overcapacity and market saturation.

Over the period since the Industrial Revolution, technological progress has had a much larger effect on the economy than any fluctuations in credit or debt, the primary exception being the Great Depression, which caused a multi-year steep economic decline. The effect of technological progress can be seen by the purchasing power of an average hour's work, which has grown from $3 in 1900 to $22 in 1990, measured in 2010 dollars. There were similar increases in real wages during the 19th century. (See: Productivity improving technologies (historical).) A table of innovations and long cycles can be seen at: Kondratiev wave § Modern modifications of Kondratiev theory. Since surprising news in the economy, which has a random aspect, impact the state of the business cycle, any corresponding descriptions must have a random part at its root that motivates the use of statistical frameworks in this area.

There were frequent crises in Europe and America in the 19th and first half of the 20th century, specifically the period 1815–1939. This period started from the end of the Napoleonic wars in 1815, which was immediately followed by the Post-Napoleonic depression in the United Kingdom (1815–1830), and culminated in the Great Depression of 1929–1939, which led into World War II. See Financial crisis: 19th century for listing and details. The first of these crises not associated with a war was the Panic of 1825.

Business cycles in OECD countries after World War II were generally more restrained than the earlier business cycles. This was particularly true during the Golden Age of Capitalism (1945/50–1970s), and the period 1945–2008 did not experience a global downturn until the Late-2000s recession. Economic stabilization policy using fiscal policy and monetary policy appeared to have dampened the worst excesses of business cycles, and automatic stabilization due to the aspects of the government's budget also helped mitigate the cycle even without conscious action by policy-makers.

In this period, the economic cycle – at least the problem of depressions – was twice declared dead. The first declaration was in the late 1960s, when the Phillips curve was seen as being able to steer the economy. However, this was followed by stagflation in the 1970s, which discredited the theory. The second declaration was in the early 2000s, following the stability and growth in the 1980s and 1990s in what came to be known as the Great Moderation. Notably, in 2003, Robert Lucas Jr., in his presidential address to the American Economic Association, declared that the "central problem of depression-prevention [has] been solved, for all practical purposes."

Various regions have experienced prolonged depressions, most dramatically the economic crisis in former Eastern Bloc countries following the end of the Soviet Union in 1991. For several of these countries the period 1989–2010 has been an ongoing depression, with real income still lower than in 1989.

== Identifying ==
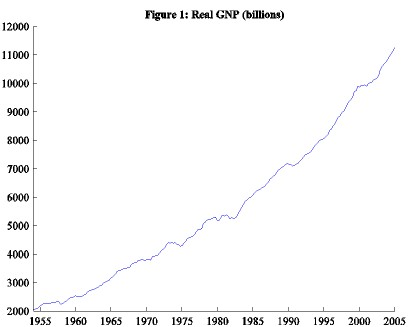
Economic activity in the United States, 1954–2005

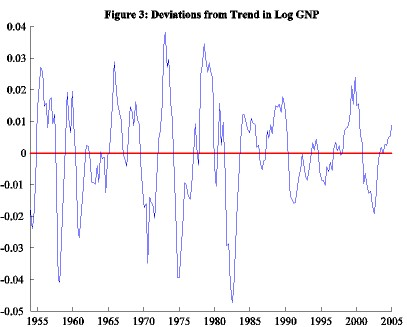
Deviations from the long-term United States growth trend, 1954–2005

In 1946, economists Arthur F. Burns and Wesley C. Mitchell provided the now standard definition of business cycles in their book Measuring Business Cycles:

Business cycles are a type of fluctuation found in the aggregate economic activity of nations that organize their work mainly in business enterprises: a cycle consists of expansions occurring at about the same time in many economic activities, followed by similarly general recessions, contractions, and revivals which merge into the expansion phase of the next cycle; in duration, business cycles vary from more than one year to ten or twelve years; they are not divisible into shorter cycles of similar characteristics with amplitudes approximating their own.

According to A. F. Burns:

Business cycles are not merely fluctuations in aggregate economic activity. The critical feature that distinguishes them from the commercial convulsions of earlier centuries or from the seasonal and other short term variations of our own age is that the fluctuations are widely diffused over the economy – its industry, its commercial dealings, and its tangles of finance. The economy of the western world is a system of closely interrelated parts. He who would understand business cycles must master the workings of an economic system organized largely in a network of free enterprises searching for profit. The problem of how business cycles come about is therefore inseparable from the problem of how a capitalist economy functions.

In the United States, the National Bureau of Economic Research's Business Cycle Dating Committee identifies peaks and troughs retrospectively. It defines an expansion as the period from a trough to a peak and a recession as the period from a peak to a trough. The committee defines a recession as a significant decline in economic activity that is spread across the economy and lasts more than a few months. It uses a range of monthly measures of aggregate real economic activity. In recent decades, it has placed the most weight on real personal income less transfers and nonfarm payroll employment. The committee waits for sufficient data before announcing a peak or trough to reduce the risk of major revisions to its chronology.

=== Upper turning points of business cycle, commodity prices and freight rates ===
There is often a close timing relationship between the upper turning points of the business cycle, commodity prices, and freight rates, which is shown to be particularly tight in the grand peak years of 1873, 1889, 1900 and 1912. Hamilton expressed that in the post war era, a majority of recessions are connected to an increase in oil price.

Commodity price shocks are considered to be a significant driving force of the US business cycle.

Along these lines, the research in [Trimbur, 2010, International Journal of Forecasting] shows empirical results for the relation between oil-prices and real GDP. The methodology uses a statistical model that incorporate level shifts in the price of crude oil; hence the approach describes the possibility of oil price shocks and forecasts the likelihood of such events.

=== Indicators ===
Economic indicators are used to measure the business cycle: consumer confidence index, retail trade index, unemployment and industry/service production index. Stock and Watson claim that financial indicators' predictive ability is not stable over different time periods because of economic shocks, random fluctuations and development in financial systems. Ludvigson believes consumer confidence index is a coincident indicator as it relates to consumer's current situations. Winton & Ralph state that retail trade index is a benchmark for the current economic level because its aggregate value counts up for two-thirds of the overall GDP and reflects the real state of the economy. According to Stock and Watson, unemployment claim can predict when the business cycle is entering a downward phase. Banbura and Rüstler argue that industry production's GDP information can be delayed as it measures real activity with real number, but it provides an accurate prediction of GDP.

Series used to infer the underlying business cycle fall into three categories: lagging, coincident, and leading. They are described as main elements of an analytic system to forecast peaks and troughs in the business cycle. For almost 30 years, these economic data series are considered as "the leading index" or "the leading indicators"-were compiled and published by the U.S. Department of Commerce.

A prominent coincident, or real-time, business cycle indicator is the Aruoba-Diebold-Scotti Index.

=== Spectral analysis of business cycles ===
Recent research employing spectral analysis has confirmed the presence of Kondratiev waves in the world GDP dynamics at an acceptable level of statistical significance. Korotayev & Tsirel also detected shorter business cycles, dating the Kuznets to about 17 years and calling it the third sub-harmonic of the Kondratiev, meaning that there are three Kuznets cycles per Kondratiev.

=== Recurrence quantification analysis ===
Recurrence quantification analysis has been employed to detect the characteristic of business cycles and economic development. To this end, Orlando et al. developed the so-called recurrence quantification correlation index to test correlations of RQA on a sample signal and then investigated the application to business time series. The said index has been proven to detect hidden changes in time series. Further, Orlando et al., over an extensive dataset, shown that recurrence quantification analysis may help in anticipating transitions from laminar (i.e. regular) to turbulent (i.e. chaotic) phases such as USA GDP in 1949, 1953, etc. Last but not least, it has been demonstrated that recurrence quantification analysis can detect differences between macroeconomic variables and highlight hidden features of economic dynamics.

=== Cycles or fluctuations? ===
The Business Cycle follows changes in stock prices which are mostly caused by external factors such as socioeconomic conditions, inflation, exchange rates. Intellectual capital does not affect a company stock's current earnings. Intellectual capital contributes to a stock's return growth.

Unlike long-term trends, medium-term data fluctuations are connected to the monetary policy transmission mechanism and its role in regulating inflation during an economic cycle. At the same time, the presence of nominal restrictions in price setting behavior might impact the short-term course of inflation.

In recent years economic theory has moved towards the study of economic fluctuation rather than a "business cycle" – though some economists use the phrase 'business cycle' as a convenient shorthand. For example, Milton Friedman said that calling the business cycle a "cycle" is a misnomer, because of its non-cyclical nature. Friedman believed that for the most part, excluding very large supply shocks, business declines are more of a monetary phenomenon. Arthur F. Burns and Wesley C. Mitchell define business cycle as a form of fluctuation. In economic activities, a cycle of expansions happening, followed by recessions, contractions, and revivals. All of which combine to form the next cycle's expansion phase; this sequence of change is repeated but not periodic.

== Proposed explanations ==
The explanation of fluctuations in aggregate economic activity is one of the primary concerns of macroeconomics and a variety of theories have been proposed to explain them.

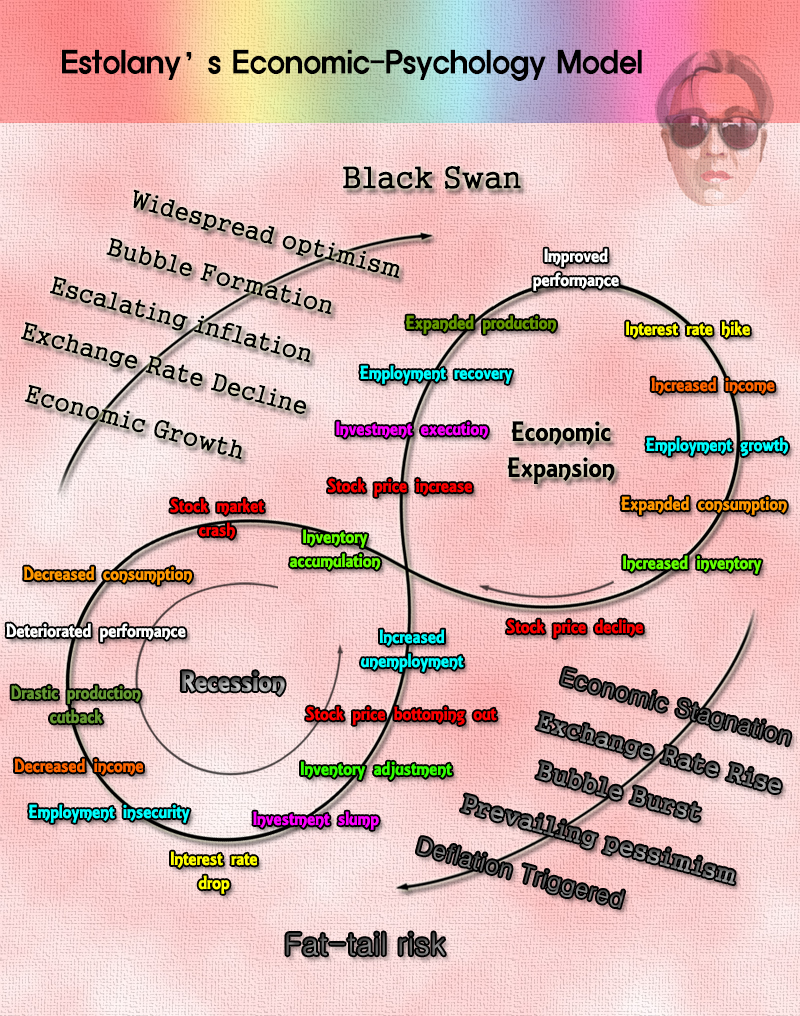
The Ribbon Model of Economic Psychology illustrating the interplay between market cycles and investor sentiment.

=== Exogenous vs. endogenous ===
Within economics, it has been debated as to whether or not the fluctuations of a business cycle are attributable to external (exogenous) versus internal (endogenous) causes. In the first case shocks are stochastic, in the second case shocks are deterministically chaotic and embedded in the economic system. The classical school (now neo-classical) argues for exogenous causes and the underconsumptionist (now Keynesian) school argues for endogenous causes. These may also broadly be classed as "supply-side" and "demand-side" explanations: supply-side explanations may be styled, following Say's law, as arguing that "supply creates its own demand", while demand-side explanations argue that effective demand may fall short of supply, yielding a recession or depression.

This debate has important policy consequences: proponents of exogenous causes of crises such as neoclassicals largely argue for minimal government policy or regulation (laissez faire), as absent these external shocks, the market functions, while proponents of endogenous causes of crises such as Keynesians largely argue for larger government policy and regulation, as absent regulation, the market will move from crisis to crisis. This division is not absolute – some classicals (including Say) argued for government policy to mitigate the damage of economic cycles, despite believing in external causes, while Austrian School economists argue against government involvement as only worsening crises, despite believing in internal causes.

The view of the economic cycle as caused exogenously dates to Say's law, and much debate on endogeneity or exogeneity of causes of the economic cycle is framed in terms of refuting or supporting Say's law; this is also referred to as the "general glut" (supply in relation to demand) debate.

Until the Keynesian Revolution in mainstream economics in the wake of the Great Depression, classical and neoclassical explanations (exogenous causes) were the mainstream explanation of economic cycles; following the Keynesian revolution, neoclassical macroeconomics was largely rejected. There has been some resurgence of neoclassical approaches in the form of real business cycle (RBC) theory. The debate between Keynesians and neo-classical advocates was reawakened following the recession of 2007.

Mainstream economists working in the neoclassical tradition, as opposed to the Keynesian tradition, have usually viewed the departures of the harmonic working of the market economy as due to exogenous influences, such as the State or its regulations, labor unions, business monopolies, or shocks due to technology or natural causes.

Contrarily, in the heterodox tradition of Jean Charles Léonard de Sismondi, Clément Juglar, and Marx the recurrent upturns and downturns of the market system are an endogenous characteristic of it.

The 19th-century school of under consumptionism also posited endogenous causes for the business cycle, notably the paradox of thrift, and today this previously heterodox school has entered the mainstream in the form of Keynesian economics via the Keynesian revolution.

=== Mainstream economics ===
Mainstream economics views business cycles as essentially "the random summation of random causes". In 1927, Eugen Slutzky observed that summing random numbers, such as the last digits of the Russian state lottery, could generate patterns akin to that we see in business cycles, an observation that has since been repeated many times. This caused economists to move away from viewing business cycles as a cycle that needed to be explained and instead viewing their apparently cyclical nature as a methodological artefact. This means that what appear to be cyclical phenomena can actually be explained as just random events that are fed into a simple linear model. Thus business cycles are essentially random shocks that average out over time. Mainstream economists have built models of business cycles based on the idea that they are caused by random shocks. Due to this inherent randomness, recessions can sometimes not occur for decades; for example, Australia did not experience any recession between 1991 and 2020.

While economists have found it difficult to forecast recessions or determine their likely severity, research indicates that longer expansions do not cause following recessions to be more severe.

=== Keynesian ===
According to Keynesian economics, fluctuations in aggregate demand cause the economy to come to short run equilibrium at levels that are different from the full employment rate of output. These fluctuations express themselves as the observed business cycles. Keynesian models do not necessarily imply periodic business cycles. However, simple Keynesian models involving the interaction of the Keynesian multiplier and accelerator give rise to cyclical responses to initial shocks. Paul Samuelson's "oscillator model" is supposed to account for business cycles thanks to the multiplier and the accelerator. The amplitude of the variations in economic output depends on the level of the investment, for investment determines the level of aggregate output (multiplier), and is determined by aggregate demand (accelerator).

In the Keynesian tradition, Richard Goodwin accounts for cycles in output by the distribution of income between business profits and workers' wages. The fluctuations in wages are almost the same as in the level of employment (wage cycle lags one period behind the employment cycle), for when the economy is at high employment, workers are able to demand rises in wages, whereas in periods of high unemployment, wages tend to fall. According to Goodwin, when unemployment and business profits rise, the output rises.

=== Cyclical behavior of exports and imports ===
Exports and imports are large components of an economy's aggregate expenditure, especially one that is oriented toward international trade. Income is an essential determinant of the level of imported goods. A higher GDP reflects a higher level of spending on imported goods and services, and vice versa. Therefore, expenditure on imported goods and services falls during a recession and rises during an economic expansion or boom.

Import expenditures are commonly considered to be procyclical and cyclical in nature, coincident with the business cycle. Domestic export expenditures give a good indication of foreign business cycles as foreign import expenditures are coincident with the foreign business cycle.

=== Credit/debt cycle ===
One alternative theory is that the primary cause of economic cycles is due to the credit cycle: the net expansion of credit (increase in private credit, equivalently debt, as a percentage of GDP) yields economic expansions, while the net contraction causes recessions, and if it persists, depressions. In particular, the bursting of speculative bubbles is seen as the proximate cause of depressions, and this theory places finance and banks at the center of the business cycle.

A primary theory in this vein is the debt deflation theory of Irving Fisher, which he proposed to explain the Great Depression. A more recent complementary theory is the Financial Instability Hypothesis of Hyman Minsky, and the credit theory of economic cycles is often associated with Post-Keynesian economics such as Steve Keen.

Post-Keynesian economist Hyman Minsky has proposed an explanation of cycles founded on fluctuations in credit, interest rates and financial frailty, called the Financial Instability Hypothesis. In an expansion period, interest rates are low and companies easily borrow money from banks to invest. Banks are not reluctant to grant them loans, because expanding economic activity allows business increasing cash flows and therefore they will be able to easily pay back the loans. This process leads to firms becoming excessively indebted, so that they stop investing, and the economy goes into recession.

While credit causes have not been a primary theory of the economic cycle within the mainstream, they have gained occasional mention, such as (Eckstein & Sinai 1990), cited approvingly by (Summers 1986).

=== Real business-cycle theory ===
Within mainstream economics, Keynesian views have been challenged by real business cycle models in which fluctuations are due to random changes in the total productivity factor (which are caused by changes in technology as well as the legal and regulatory environment). This theory is most associated with Finn E. Kydland and Edward C. Prescott, and more generally the Chicago school of economics (freshwater economics). They consider that economic crisis and fluctuations cannot stem from a monetary shock, only from an external shock, such as an innovation.

=== Product based theory of economic cycles ===
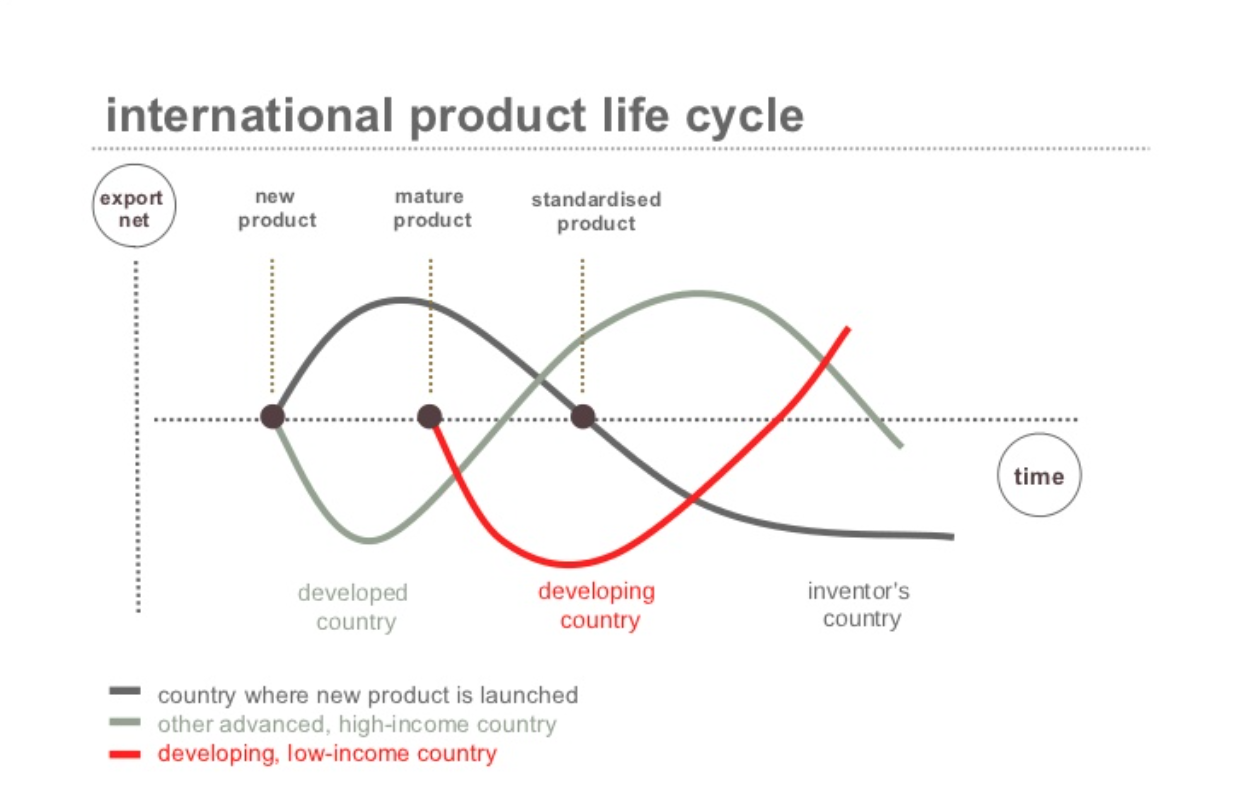
International product life cycle

This theory explains the nature and causes of economic cycles from the viewpoint of life-cycle of marketable goods. The theory originates from the work of Raymond Vernon, who described the development of international trade in terms of product life-cycle – a period of time during which the product circulates in the market. Vernon stated that some countries specialize in the production and export of technologically new products, while others specialize in the production of already known products. The most developed countries are able to invest large amounts of money in the technological innovations and produce new products, thus obtaining a dynamic comparative advantage over developing countries.

Recent research by Georgiy Revyakin proved initial Vernon theory and showed economic cycles in developed countries overran economic cycles in developing countries. He also presumed economic cycles with different periodicity can be compared to the products with various life-cycles. In case of Kondratiev waves such products correlate with fundamental discoveries implemented in production (inventions which form the technological paradigm: Richard Arkwright's machines, steam engines, industrial use of electricity, computer invention, etc.); Kuznets cycles describe such products as infrastructural components (roadways, transport, utilities, etc.); Juglar cycles may go in parallel with enterprise fixed capital (equipment, machinery, etc.), and Kitchin cycles are characterized by change in the society preferences (tastes) for consumer goods, and time, which is necessary to start the production.

Highly competitive market conditions would determine simultaneous technological updates of all economic agents (as a result, cycle formation): in case if a manufacturing technology at an enterprise does not meet the current technological environment – such company loses its competitiveness and eventually goes bankrupt.

=== Political business cycle ===
Another set of models tries to derive the business cycle from political decisions. The political business cycle theory is strongly linked to the name of Michał Kalecki who discussed "the reluctance of the 'captains of industry' to accept government intervention in the matter of employment". Persistent full employment would mean increasing workers' bargaining power to raise wages and to avoid doing unpaid labor, potentially hurting profitability. However, he did not see this theory as applying under fascism, which would use direct force to destroy labor's power.

In recent years, proponents of the "electoral business cycle" theory have argued that incumbent politicians encourage prosperity before elections in order to ensure re-election – and make the citizens pay for it with recessions afterwards. The political business cycle is an alternative theory stating that when an administration of any hue is elected, it initially adopts a contractionary policy to reduce inflation and gain a reputation for economic competence. It then adopts an expansionary policy in the lead up to the next election, hoping to achieve simultaneously low inflation and unemployment on election day.

The partisan business cycle suggests that cycles result from the successive elections of administrations with different policy regimes. Regime A adopts expansionary policies, resulting in growth and inflation, but is voted out of office when inflation becomes unacceptably high. The replacement, Regime B, adopts contractionary policies reducing inflation and growth, and the downwards swing of the cycle. It is voted out of office when unemployment is too high, being replaced by Party A.

=== Marxian economics ===
For Marx, the economy based on production of commodities to be sold in the market is intrinsically prone to crisis. In the heterodox Marxian view, profit is the major engine of the market economy, but business (capital) profitability has a tendency to fall that recurrently creates crises in which mass unemployment occurs, businesses fail, remaining capital is centralized and concentrated and profitability is recovered. In the long run, these crises tend to be more severe and the system will eventually fail.

Some Marxist authors such as Rosa Luxemburg viewed the lack of purchasing power of workers as a cause of a tendency of supply to be larger than demand, creating crisis, in a model that has similarities with the Keynesian one. Indeed, a number of modern authors have tried to combine Marx's and Keynes's views. Henryk Grossman reviewed the debates and the counteracting tendencies and Paul Mattick subsequently emphasized the basic differences between the Marxian and the Keynesian perspective. While Keynes saw capitalism as a system worth maintaining and susceptible to efficient regulation, Marx viewed capitalism as a historically doomed system that cannot be put under societal control.

The American mathematician and economist Richard M. Goodwin formalised a Marxist model of business cycles known as the Goodwin Model in which recession was caused by increased bargaining power of workers (a result of high employment in boom periods) pushing up the wage share of national income, suppressing profits and leading to a breakdown in capital accumulation. Later theorists applying variants of the Goodwin model have identified both short and long period profit-led growth and distribution cycles in the United States and elsewhere. David Gordon provided a Marxist model of long period institutional growth cycles in an attempt to explain the Kondratiev wave. This cycle is due to the periodic breakdown of the social structure of accumulation, a set of institutions which secure and stabilize capital accumulation.

=== Austrian School ===
Economists of the heterodox Austrian School argue that business cycles are caused by excessive issuance of credit by banks in fractional reserve banking systems. According to Austrian economists, excessive issuance of bank credit may be exacerbated if central bank monetary policy sets interest rates too low, and the resulting expansion of the money supply causes a "boom" in which resources are misallocated or "malinvested" because of artificially low interest rates. Eventually, the boom cannot be sustained and is followed by a "bust" in which the malinvestments are liquidated (sold for less than their original cost) and the money supply contracts.

One of the criticisms of the Austrian business cycle theory is based on the observation that the United States suffered recurrent economic crises in the 19th century, notably the Panic of 1873, which occurred prior to the establishment of a U.S. central bank in 1913. Thomas Woods, a proponent of the Austrian School, argues that these earlier financial crises were prompted by government and bankers' efforts to expand credit despite restraints imposed by the prevailing gold standard, and are thus consistent with Austrian Business Cycle Theory.

The Austrian explanation of the business cycle differs significantly from the mainstream understanding of business cycles and is generally rejected by mainstream economists. Mainstream economists generally do not support Austrian school explanations for business cycles, on both theoretical as well as real-world empirical grounds. Austrians claim that the boom-and-bust business cycle is caused by government intervention into the economy, and that the cycle would be comparatively rare and mild without central government interference. They point to recession of 1920-1921 as an example of this, in contrast to the Great Depression. In 1920, the government cut taxes, and reduced spending. The economy rebounded in one year. During the Great Depression, the federal government created the New Deal programs and recovery took longer than a decade.

=== Yield curve ===
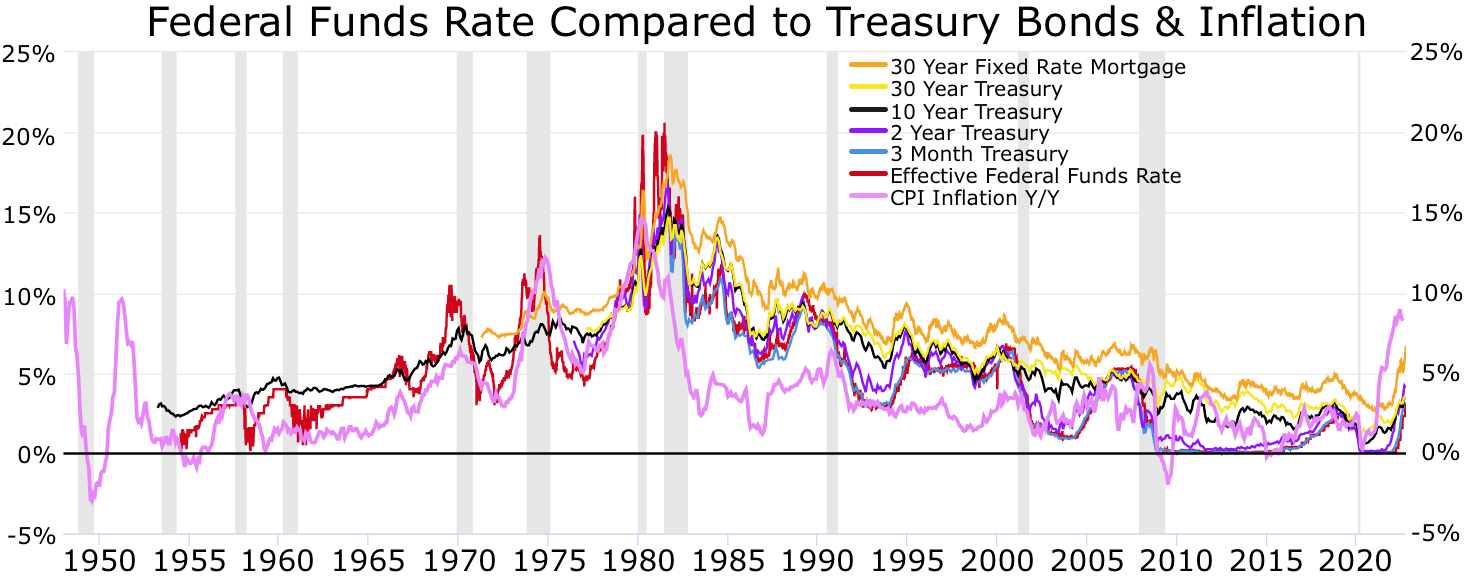
30 year mortgage average 30 Year Treasury Bond 10 Year Treasury Bond 2 Year Treasury Bond 3 month Treasury Bond Effective Federal Funds Rate CPI inflation year/year Recessions

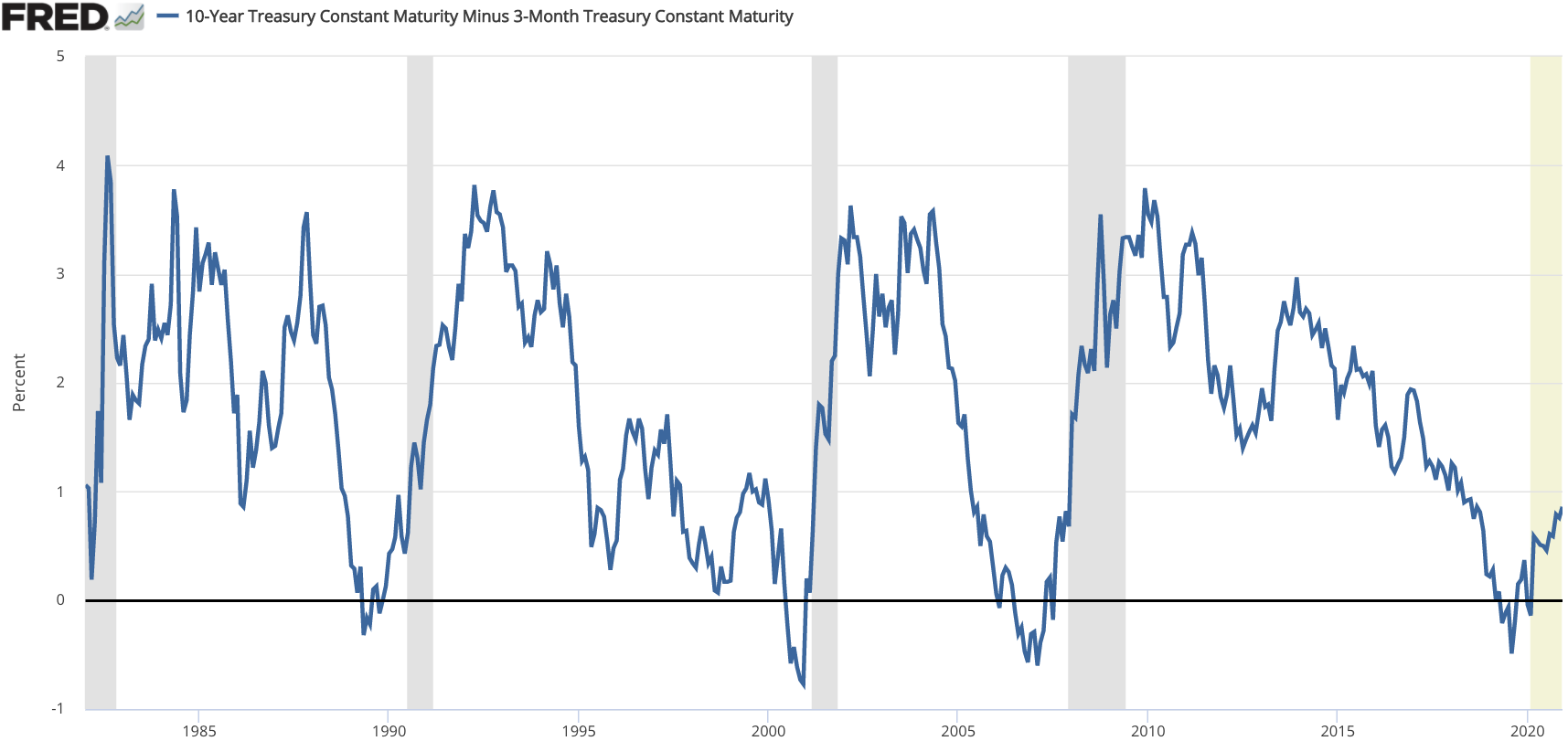
10-year minus 3-month US Treasury Yields

The slope of the yield curve is one of the most powerful predictors of future economic growth, inflation, and recessions. One measure of the yield curve slope (i.e. the difference between 10-year Treasury bond rate and the 3-month Treasury bond rate) is included in the Financial Stress Index published by the St. Louis Fed. A different measure of the slope (i.e. the difference between 10-year Treasury bond rates and the federal funds rate) is incorporated into the Index of Leading Economic Indicators published by The Conference Board.

An inverted yield curve is often a harbinger of recession. A positively sloped yield curve is often a harbinger of inflationary growth. Work by Arturo Estrella and Tobias Adrian has established the predictive power of an inverted yield curve to signal a recession. Their models show that when the difference between short-term interest rates (they use 3-month T-bills) and long-term interest rates (10-year Treasury bonds) at the end of a federal reserve tightening cycle is negative or less than 93 basis points positive that a rise in unemployment usually occurs. The New York Fed publishes a monthly recession probability prediction derived from the yield curve and based on Estrella's work.

All the recessions in the United States since 1970 (up through 2017) have been preceded by an inverted yield curve (10-year vs. 3-month). Over the same time frame, every occurrence of an inverted yield curve has been followed by recession as declared by the NBER business cycle dating committee.

Event	Date of inversion start	Date of the recession start	Time from inversion to recession Start	Duration of inversion	Time from recession start to NBER announcement	Time from disinversion to recession end	Duration of recession	Time from recession end to NBER announcement	Max inversion
			Months	Months	Months	Months	Months	Months	Basis points
1970 recession	December 1968	January 1970	13	15	NA	8	11	NA	−52
1974 recession	June 1973	December 1973	6	18	NA	3	16	NA	−159
1980 recession	November 1978	February 1980	15	18	4	2	6	12	−328
1981–1982 recession	October 1980	August 1981	10	12	5	13	16	8	−351
1990 recession	June 1989	August 1990	14	7	8	14	8	21	−16
2001 recession	July 2000	April 2001	9	7	7	9	8	20	−70
2008–2009 recession	August 2006	January 2008	17	10	11	24	18	15	−51
2020 recession	March 2020	April 2020							
Average since 1969			12	12	7	10	12	15	−147
Standard deviation since 1969			3.83	4.72	2.74	7.50	4.78	5.45	138.96

Estrella and others have postulated that the yield curve affects the business cycle via the balance sheet of banks (or bank-like financial institutions). When the yield curve is inverted banks are often caught paying more on short-term deposits (or other forms of short-term wholesale funding) than they are making on long-term loans leading to a loss of profitability and reluctance to lend resulting in a credit crunch. When the yield curve is upward sloping, banks can profitably take-in short term deposits and make long-term loans so they are eager to supply credit to borrowers. This eventually leads to a credit bubble.

=== Georgism ===
Henry George claimed land price fluctuations were the primary cause of most business cycles.

=== Other factors ===
Population swings can impact business cycles.

== Mitigating an economic downturn ==
Many social indicators, such as mental health, crimes, and suicides, worsen during economic recessions (though general mortality tends to fall, and it is in expansions when it tends to increase). As periods of economic stagnation are painful for the many who lose their jobs, there is often political pressure for governments to mitigate recessions. Since the 1940s, following the Keynesian Revolution, most governments of developed nations have seen the mitigation of the business cycle as part of the responsibility of government, under the rubric of stabilization policy.

Since in the Keynesian view, recessions are caused by inadequate aggregate demand, when a recession occurs the government should increase the amount of aggregate demand and bring the economy back into equilibrium. This the government can do in two ways, firstly by increasing the money supply (expansionary monetary policy) and secondly by increasing government spending or cutting taxes (expansionary fiscal policy).

By contrast, some economists, notably New classical economist Robert Lucas, argue that the welfare cost of business cycles are very small to negligible, and that governments should focus on long-term growth instead of stabilization.

However, even according to Keynesian theory, managing economic policy to smooth out the cycle is a difficult task in a society with a complex economy. Some theorists, notably those who believe in Marxian economics, believe that this difficulty is insurmountable. Karl Marx claimed that recurrent business cycle crises were an inevitable result of the operations of the capitalistic system. In this view, all that the government can do is to change the timing of economic crises. The crisis could also show up in a different form, for example as severe inflation or a steadily increasing government deficit. Worse, by delaying a crisis, government policy is seen as making it more dramatic and thus more painful.

Additionally, since the 1960s neoclassical economists have played down the ability of Keynesian policies to manage an economy. Since the 1960s, economists like Nobel Laureates Milton Friedman and Edmund Phelps have made ground in their arguments that inflationary expectations negate the Phillips curve in the long run. The stagflation of the 1970s provided striking support for their theories while proving a dilemma for Keynesian policies, which appeared to necessitate both expansionary policies to mitigate recession and contractionary policies to reduce inflation. Friedman has gone so far as to argue that all the central bank of a country should do is to avoid making large mistakes, as he believes they did by contracting the money supply very rapidly in the face of the Wall Street crash of 1929, in which they made what would have been a recession into the Great Depression.

== Software ==
The Hodrick-Prescott and the Christiano-Fitzgerald filters can be implemented using the R package mFilter, while singular spectrum filters can be implemented using the R package ASSA.

== See also ==
- Benner Cycle – 1884 chart predicting market cycles
- Dynamic stochastic general equilibrium – Macroeconomic method
- Economic Cycle Research Institute – US think tank
- Information revolution
- Inventory investment over the business cycle
- List of commodity booms
- List of financial crises in the United States
- Market trend
- Skyscraper Index – Idea that the construction of skyscrapers predicts an economic crash
- Welfare cost of business cycles
- World-systems theory – Approach emphasizing the world-system as the primary unit of social analysis
