= Mordecai Ezekiel =

American economist

Mordecai Joseph Brill Ezekiel (May 10, 1899 – October 31, 1974) was an American agrarian economist who worked for the United States government and the United Nations Food and Agriculture Organization (FAO). He was a "New Deal economic advisor" who shaped much of the President Franklin D. Roosevelt's agricultural policy.

== Career ==
He is credited with formulating the details of what was to become the Agriculture Adjustment Administration, and helped prepare a draft of the Agricultural Adjustment Act. After the 1932 presidential election, he also met with President-elect Franklin Roosevelt, Rexford Tugwell, M. L. Wilson, and Henry Morgenthau Jr., to discuss the farm policy of the new administration.

- 1930–1933 – Assistant Chief Economist for the Federal Farm Board
- 1933–1944 – Economic Advisor to the Secretary of Agriculture
  - 1943 – Helped plan the UN Conference on Food and Agriculture held in Hot Springs, Virginia
- 1944–1947 – Economic Advisor in the Bureau of Agriculture Economics
  - 1944 – member of the UN Interim Commission on Food and Agriculture
  - 1945 – served as a member of two of the FAO's first field missions to Greece and Poland
- 1947–1962 – at FAO: Economist in charge of the Economic Analysis Branch, Deputy Director of the Economics Division, Head of the Economics Department, Assistant Director General in charge of the Economics Department, and Special Assistant to the Director General
- 1962–1967 – Chief of the UN Division of the United States Agency for International Development

He and G.C. Haas described the pork cycle.

== Personal life ==
Born in Richmond, Virginia, he was the son of Jacob and Rachel Brill Ezekiel (who had been a secretary to the suffragist Carrie Chapman Catt). He had two brothers, Walter Naphtali Ezekiel, a plant pathologist, and Raphael Ezekiel, a graduate of West Point, and one sister, Bertha Brill Ezekiel (Topkis).

Ezekiel graduated in 1918 from the Maryland Agricultural College with a Bachelor of Science degree in agriculture. He also earned a Master of Science degree in 1923 from the University of Minnesota and a PhD in economics from the Robert Brookings Graduate School of Economics and Government.

Ezekiel traveled abroad as a Guggenheim Fellow from 1930 to 1931.

Ezekiel married Lucille Finsterwald and they had three children—David, Jonathan, and Margot. He was also the uncle of the Hebrew poet Yosef Yehezkel. A scholarship in his name was endowed at the University of Maryland in 1963.

== Select bibliography ==
- Ezekiel, Mordecai (February 1938). "The Cobweb Theorem" (PDF). Quarterly Journal of Economics. 52 (2): 255–280. doi:10.2307/1881734. JSTOR 1881734. Archived from the original (PDF) on June 16, 2015.
- Jobs for All Through Industrial Expansion. New York: Alfred A. Knopf. 1939.
- Towards World Prosperity: Through Industrial and Agricultural Development and Expansion. Harper & Brothers. 1947.
