= Robertson lag =

The Robertson Lag is an example of the systematic delay which the economy suffers from when conditions change and is named after the famous economist Dennis Robertson. This lag describes how a consumers change in income and wealth, a change in its consumption function, leads to a delayed change in its consumption.

== See also ==
- Lundberg lag
