= Feed ratio =

Measure of profitability of animal husbandry

A feed ratio is a measure of profitability of animal husbandry, expressed as the ratio between the cost of food and the price of the final product.

For example, in pig farming, the hog/corn ratio is the number of bushels of corn equal in value to 100 pounds of live hogs. Put another way, it is the price of hogs, per hundredweight, divided by the price of corn per bushel. Since corn is a major input cost to hog producers, the higher the price of hogs relative to corn, the more profit there is in feeding hogs.

In dairy farming, the milk-feed price ratio is a measure of the value of 16% protein ration to one pound of whole milk. As with the hog/corn ratio, this relationship is an indicator of the profitability of milk production.

== See also ==
- Pork cycle
