= Clément Juglar =

French doctor and statistician (1819–1905)

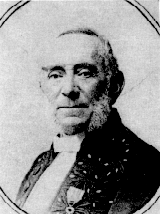
- Born: 15 October 1819; Paris, France
- Died: 28 February 1905 (aged 85); Paris, France
- Occupations: Doctor, statistician
- Known for: Idea of business cycles

Clément Juglar (15 October 1819 – 28 February 1905) was a French medical doctor and statistician.

== Juglar cycles ==
He was one of the first to develop an economic theory of business cycles. He identified the fixed investment cycle of six to ten years that is now associated with his name. Within the Juglar cycle one can observe oscillations of investments into fixed capital and not just changes in the level of employment of the fixed capital (and respective changes in inventories), as is observed with respect to Kitchin cycles.

== Juglar's impact ==
Juglar's publications led to other business cycle theories by later economists such as Joseph Schumpeter.

== Publications of Clément Juglar ==
- "Des crises commerciales", 1856, in Annuaire de l'economie politique.
- Des Crises commerciales et leur retour periodique en France, en Angleterre, et aux Etats-Unis. Paris: Guillaumin, 1862.
- Du Change et de la liberte d'émission, 1868.
- Les Banques de depôt, d'escompte et d'émission, 1884.

== See also ==
- Juglar cycle
- Fixed investment
- Business cycle
- Fixed capital
