= Richard M. Goodwin =

American mathematician and economist

- Born: February 24, 1913; New Castle, Indiana
- Died: August 13, 1996 (aged 83)
- Education: Harvard

Richard M. Goodwin (February 24, 1913 – August 13, 1996) was an American mathematician and economist.

== Background ==
Goodwin was born in New Castle, Indiana. He received his BA and PhD at Harvard and taught there from 1942 until 1950. He fled the United States during the McCarthy era, then taught at the University of Cambridge until 1979 and the University of Siena until 1984. Although he became a university lecturer in the Cambridge faculty of economics and politics in 1951, it was not until five years later that he agreed to join the fellowship of a college, choosing that of Peterhouse. Christopher Calladine thinks that this unusual situation may have been because Goodwin initially had ideological opposition to the notion of the college system, which he may have considered to be anachronistic. Later, after retiring from Cambridge, Goodwin was the first non-Italian professor of economics at Siena.

Goodwin described himself as "a lifelong but wayward Marxist", joining the Communist Party of Great Britain while a Rhodes Scholar at Oxford in the 1930s and then its American counterpart when he got back to the United States. However, Goodwin left after the announcement of the Molotov–Ribbentrop Pact.

== Work ==
Goodwin worked on the interaction between long run growth and business cycles. His article on matrix multiplier was one of the earliest uses of the Perron–Frobenius theorem in economics, although his reasoning had an error that was diagnosed by Frank H. Hahn. He returned to the Perron–Frobenius theorem with his book The Dynamics of A Capitalist Economy.

Goodwin's interest in applying the theory of nonlinear systems to macroeconomics was sparked by Philippe Le Corbeiller, who taught applied physics at Harvard. Following an early suggestion of Le Corbeiller's, Goodwin characterized the business cycle as a non-linear self-oscillation. Goodwin credited Le Corbeiller with teaching him nonlinear dynamics while Le Corbeiller credited Goodwin with the discovery of the two-stroke oscillator.

Goodwin adopted the Lotka–Volterra equations for the population dynamics of a predator and a prey species as the basis of the Goodwin model (or Goodwin's class struggle model) of economic growth. In his model, employed workers have the role of predators as their wage demands squeeze profits and hence investment, causing a subsequent increase in unemployment. Another model, Goodwin's non-linear accelerator, is also a model of endogenous cycles in economic activity in which the cycles do not rely on outside shocks or structurally unstable parameters. "A Growth Cycle" (1967) saw Goodwin utilise Volterra's equations to formalise Karl Marx's theory of economic cycles.

== Major articles ==
- "Multiplier Effects of a Balanced Budget, Notes", 1946, Econometrica.
- "Innovations and the Irregularity of Economics Cycles", 1946, Review of Economics and Statistics.
- "Dynamic Coupling with Especial Reference to Markets Having Production Lags", 1947, Econometrica.
- "The Business Cycle as a Self-Sustaining Oscillation", 1949, Econometrica.
- "The Multiplier as a Matrix", 1949, Economic Journal.
- "A Nonlinear Theory of the Cycle", 1950, Review of Economic Studies.
- "Does the Matrix Multiplier Oscillate?", 1950, Economic Journal.
- "The Nonlinear Accelerator and the Persistence of Business Cycles", 1951, Econometrica.
- "The Optimal Growth Path for an Underdeveloped Economy", 1961, Economic Journal.
- "A Growth Cycle", 1967, in Feinstein, editor, Socialism, Capitalism and Economic Growth.
- "A Growth Cycle", 1972, in E.K. Hunt and J.G. Schwatz, editors, A Critique of Economic Theory.
- "A Note on Wage, Profits and Fluctuating Growth Rate", 1983, Cambridge Journal of Economics.
- "Disaggregating Models of Fluctuating Growth", 1984, in Goodwin et al., editors, Non-linear Models of Fluctuating Growth.
- "Swinging Along the Turnpike with von Neumann and Sraffa", 1986, Cambridge Journal of Economics.
- "The Dynamics of a Capitalist Economy: A multi-sectoral approach," with L.F. Punzo, 1987.
- "The Multiplier-Accelerator Discretely Revisited", 1988, in Ricci and Vellupilai, editors, Growth cycles and multisectoral economics, the Goodwin tradition.
- "Swinging Along the Autostrada: Cyclical fluctuations along the von Neumann Ray", 1989, in Dore et al., John von Neumann and Modern Economics.
- Essays in Nonlinear Economic Dynamics, 1989.
- Chaotic Economic Dynamics, 1990.
- "Schumpeter, Keynes and the Theory of Economic Evolution", 1991, Journal of Evolutionary Economics.
- "Nonlinear Dynamics and Economic Evolution", 1991, in Niels Thygesen et al., editors, Business Cycles.

For more details on Goodwin's professional contributions see:

- Nonlinear and Mutisectoral Macrodynamics: Essays in Honour of Richard Goodwin. (ed. K. Velupillai), Macmillan, London, 1989.
- "The Vintage Economist", The Journal of Economic Behaviour and Organisation, Vol. 37, No. 1, September 1998, pp. 1–31.
- "Richard Goodwin: 1913-1996", The Economic Journal, Vol. 108, September 1998, pp. 1436–1449.
