= Joseph Kitchin =

British businessman and statistician (1861–1932)

- Born: 1861
- Died: 1932 (aged 70–71)
- Occupation: Businessman

Joseph Kitchin (1861–1932) was a British businessman and statistician. Analysing American and English interest rates and other data, Kitchin found evidence for a short business cycle of about 40 months. His publications led to other business cycle theories by later economists such as Nikolai Kondratieff, Simon Kuznets, and Joseph Schumpeter.

In 1888, he joined the staff of the Financial News, as compiler of statistics, especially of South African gold mines. He became an authority on the statistics of precious metals. With this work, he got interested in trade cycles.

The Kitchin cycle is believed to be accounted for by time lags in information movements affecting the decision making of commercial firms. Firms react to the improvement of commercial situation through the increase in output through the full employment of the extent fixed capital assets. As a result, within a certain period of time (ranging between a few months and two years) the market gets ‘flooded’ with commodities whose quantity becomes gradually excessive. The demand declines, prices drop, the produced commodities get accumulated in inventories, which informs entrepreneurs of the necessity to reduce output.

However, this process takes some time. It takes some time for the information that the supply exceeds significantly the demand to get to the businessmen. Further, it takes entrepreneurs some time to check this information and to make the decision to reduce production, some time is also necessary to materialize this decision (these are the time lags that generate the Kitchin cycles). Another relevant time lag is the lag between the materialization of the above-mentioned decision (causing the capital assets to work well below the level of their full employment) and the decrease of the excessive amounts of commodities accumulated in inventories. Yet, after this decrease takes place one can observe the conditions for a new phase of growth of demand, prices, output, etc.
