= Kuznets swing =

Proposed economic wave of 15–25 years

Proposed economic waves
Cycle/wave name	Period (years)
Kitchin cycle (inventory, e.g. pork cycle)	3–5
Juglar cycle (fixed investment)	7–11
Kuznets swing (infrastructural investment)	15–25
Kondratiev wave (technological basis)	45–60

The Kuznets swing (or Kuznets cycle) is a claimed medium-range economic wave with a period of 15–25 years identified in 1930 by Simon Kuznets. Kuznets connected these waves with demographic processes, in particular with immigrant inflows/outflows and the changes in construction intensity that they caused, that is why he denoted them as "demographic" or "building" cycles/swings. Kuznets swings have been also interpreted as infrastructural investment cycles.

Some modern economic commentators argue the Kuznets swing reflects an 18-year cycle in land values. Fred Harrison argues this cycle of boom and bust could be smoothed or avoided altogether by levying an annual tax on the value of land (land value tax).

Kuznets' analysis was criticized by Howrey (1968). Howrey claimed that the apparent business cycle found by Kuznets was an artifact of the filter Kuznets used. Howrey suggested that the same cyclical pattern could be found in white noise series when the Kuznets filter was applied.
