= Juglar cycle =

Fixed investment cycle of 7 to 11 years

Proposed economic waves
Cycle/wave name	Period (years)
Kitchin cycle (inventory, e.g. pork cycle)	3–5
Juglar cycle (fixed investment)	7–11
Kuznets swing (infrastructural investment)	15–25
Kondratiev wave (technological basis)	45–60

The Juglar cycle is a fixed investment cycle of 7 to 11 years identified in 1862 by Clément Juglar. Within the Juglar cycle one can observe oscillations of investments into fixed capital and not just changes in the level of employment of the fixed capital (and respective changes in inventories), as is observed with respect to Kitchin cycles. 2010 research employing spectral analysis confirmed the presence of Juglar cycles in world GDP dynamics.

== See also ==
- Fixed investment
- Business cycle
