= Pork cycle =

Phenomenon of fluctuations of supply and prices in livestock markets

A schematic diagram of the pork cycle

In economics, the term pork cycle, hog cycle, or cattle cycle describes the phenomenon of cyclical fluctuations of supply and prices in markets. It was first observed in 1925 in the pig market in the US by Mordecai Ezekiel and in Europe in 1927 by the German scholar Arthur Hanau. In short, the pork cycle runs as thus:

1. As pork, being a rare good, is a high-priced item, a few farmers decide to start raising pigs. While pig supply is limited, prices remain high.
2. More farmers realise the value potential and also begin raising pigs. As more and more piggeries come 'online' and start delivering pigs, the price begins to decrease.
3. At some point, demand and supply equalise. Pig farms are still producing pigs and supply begins to outstrip demand. The prices decrease further. Pork becomes a common commodity, and consumers may get bored of pork.
4. In view of the decrease in prices, farmers turn away from raising pigs, and go back to more valuable crops or livestock.
5. As a result, the pork supply begins to decline, eventually below demand, and then pork goes back to being a high-priced item.
6. The cycle begins all over.

While the pork cycle is so named for its genesis in the economic analysis of a livestock market, the phenomenon can be observed on the markets of many goods.

== Explanations of cycles in livestock markets ==
=== The cobweb model ===
Nicholas Kaldor proposed a model of fluctuations in agricultural markets called the cobweb model, based on production lags and adaptive expectations. In his model, when prices are high, more investments are made. However, the effect of these investments is delayed due to the breeding time - the production lag. Eventually, the market becomes saturated, leading to a decline in prices. Production is thus decreased and again, this takes time to be noticed, leading to increased demand and again increased prices. The cycle continues to repeat, producing a supply-demand graph resembling a cobweb.

The model has also been applied in certain labour sectors: high salaries in a particular sector lead to an increased number of students studying the relevant subject; when these students enter the job market at the same time after several years of studying, their job prospects and salaries are much worse due to the new surplus of applicants. This in turn deters students from studying this subject, producing a deficiency and higher wages once again.

=== An alternative model ===
Kaldor's model involves an assumption that investors make systematic mistakes. In his model, investing (i.e. breeding cattle rather than slaughtering them) when prices are high causes future prices to fall - foreseeing this (i.e. slaughtering more when prices are high) can yield higher profits for the investors. Sherwin Rosen, Kevin M. Murphy, and José Scheinkman (1994) proposed an alternative model in which cattle ranchers have perfectly rational expectations about future prices. They showed that even in this case, the three-year lifetime of beef cattle would cause rational ranchers to choose breeding versus slaughtering in a way that would cause cattle populations to fluctuate over time.

== See also ==
- Feedback
- Hog/corn ratio
- Kitchin cycle
- Oscillation
