= Jacob van Gelderen =

Dutch economist (1891–1940)

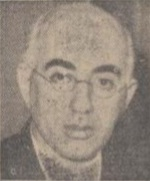
- J. van Gelderen
- Born: 10 March 1891
- Died: 14 May 1940 (aged 49)

Academic work
- Discipline: Macroeconomics
- School or tradition: Marxian economics

Jacob van Gelderen (10 March 1891, Amsterdam – 14 May 1940, The Hague) was a Dutch economist. Alongside Salomon de Wolff, he proposed the existence of 50- to 60-year long economic super cycles, now known as Kondratiev waves.

Van Gelderen became a corresponding member of the Royal Netherlands Academy of Arts and Sciences in 1927, he resigned in 1936.

A Jew, Van Geldern died by suicide along with his family during the German invasion of the Netherlands in 1940.
