= Sensorization =

Sensorization is a modern technology trend to insert many similar sensors in any device or application. Some scientists believe that sensorization is one of main requirements for third technological revolution.

As a result of significant prices drop in recent years there is a trend to include large number of sensors with the same or different function in one device. An example is the evolution of the iPhone.

== See also ==
Acsensorize
