= Smihula waves =

Long-term waves of technological progress

Smihula waves (or Smihula cycles, Smihula waves of technological revolutions, economic waves of technological revolutions) are long-term waves of technological progress which are reflected also in long-term economic waves. They are a crucial notion of Daniel Šmihula's theory of technological progress.

== Characteristics of the theory ==
The Smihula's theory of waves of technological revolutions is based on the idea that the main technological innovations are introduced in society and the economy not continually but in specific waves, and the time spans of these waves is shortening due to technological progress.

The time period with the highest concentration of technological innovations is labeled as a "technological revolution" A period of technological revolution (an innovation phase) is associated with economic revival. When new as well as already-proven and reliable technologies are available, interest in new technological development temporarily declines and investment is diverted from research to maximal practical utilization. This period may be termed an application phase. It is also associated with economic growth and perhaps even an economic boom. However, at a certain moment profitability (profit/price ratio) from new innovations and new sectors declines to the level acquired from older traditional sectors. Markets are saturated by technological products – (market saturation – everybody has a mobile phone, every small town has a railway station) and new capital investment in this originally new sector will not bring any above-average profit (e.g. the first railways connected the biggest cities with many potential passengers, later ones had ever smaller and smaller customer potential, and the level of profit from each new railway was therefore lower than from the previous one). At this moment economic stagnation and crisis begin – but a will to risk and to try something new emerges. The stagnation and crisis are therefore overcome by a new technological revolution with new innovations which will revitalize the economy. And this new technological revolution is the beginning of a new wave.

The internal structure of each long wave of technological innovations with economic implications is as follows:

a) innovation phase – technological revolution (an economic revival after the crisis from the end of a previous wave)

b) application phase (an economic boom)

c) saturation of economy and society with innovations, impossibility of further extensive growth (an economic crisis)

== Technological revolutions ==
In Smihula theory technological revolutions are the main engine of economic development, and hence long-term economic cycles are dependent on these waves of technological innovation. Smihula identified during the modern age in society six waves of technological innovations begun by technological revolutions (one of them is a hypothetical revolution in the near future). Unlike other scholars he believed that it is possible to find similar technological revolutions and long-term economic waves dependent on them even in pre-modern ages. (This is the most original part of the Smihula's theory.)

Pre-modern technological waves:

Wave	Period	Technological revolution	The most important innovations
A.	1900–1100 BC	Indo-European technological revolution	horse-breeding, chariots, iron
B.	700–200 BC	Celtic and Greek technological revolution	iron tools and weapons, Greek classical civilization
C.	300–700 AD	Germano-Slavic technological revolution	two-field crop rotation, improvements in iron metallurgy, heavy plough, longboat, horse stirrups
D.	930–1200	Medieval technological revolution	horse-collar, horse-shoes, water and wind mills, paper, beans, fertilization, heavy cavalry, crossbow, three-field crop rotation, university
E.	1340–1470	Renaissance technological revolution	eyeglasses, fire-arms, spinning wheel, Hindu-Arabic numerals, blast furnace, letterpress, watch, astrolabe, compass, oceanic sails

Modern technological waves:

Wave
Period
Technological revolution
The leading sectors
1.
1600–1740
Financial-agricultural

revolution

finance, agriculture, trade
2.
1780–1840
Industrial revolution
textiles, iron, coal, railways, canals
3.
1880–1920
Technical revolution
chemistry, electrotechnical industry, machinery
4.
1940–1970
Scientific-technical

revolution

air-industry, nuclear industry, astronautics, synthetic materials,

oil industry, cybernetics

5.
1985–2000
Information and

telecommunications revolution

telecommunications, cybernetics, informatics, internet
6.
2015–2025 (?)
hypothetical post-information

technological revolution

biomedicine, nanotechnology, alternative fuel systems

Theory of Smihula waves of technological revolutions is popular among supporters of the long economic waves (e.g. Kondratieff cycles) and among scholars who believe that the Great Recession was a result of the technological stagnation.

== Controversy ==
As Smihula published his theory in the time of revived interest in long economic cycles and when a link between economic cycles and technological revolutions was generally accepted (e.g. in works of Carlota Perez), it did not evoke strong criticism or opposition. On the other side it has the same problem as the other long-cycles theories – it is sometime hard to support them by exact data and the potential curve of a long time development is always modified by other short-time factors – therefore its course is always only a rather abstract reconstruction. Also the idea of concentration of the most important innovation in certain bordered periods seems to be very logical, but its verification depends on a very subjective definition of the "most important" innovations. Smihula's theory of long waves of technological innovations and economic cycles dependent on them is more popular in Russia, Brazil and India than in Europe.
