= Spending wave =

Proposed economic waves
Cycle/wave name	Period (years)
Kitchin cycle (inventory, e.g. pork cycle)	3–5
Juglar cycle (fixed investment)	7–11
Kuznets swing (infrastructural investment)	15–25
Kondratiev wave (technological basis)	45–60

In the economics of demography, the term spending wave refers to the economic effect of departure of children from the home. When a society experiences a high level of such family change then an economic decline follows from reduced spending overall.

== Example ==
For example, in U.S. contemporary economics, Harry Dent, a University of South Carolina and Harvard Business School graduate and Fortune 100 consultant, has popularized the baby-boomer spending wave theory. According to Dent, the stock-market decline of 2008 was a result of baby boomers aging past their peak spending years. This prediction was based on the observation that consumer spending peaks near age 50. In 2002 Dan Arnold echoed this theory in his book The Great Bust Ahead, with the big spenders being 45- to 54-year-olds, and their numbers peaking in 2011–2012.

Other authors, such as Schieber and Shoven, suggest that the gradual peaking of the social security trust fund in the United States will occur around the 2007–2009 time period.

Some experts expected the worst consumer recession, since 1980, to occur when aging boomers start retiring, adding to rising unemployment, decline in house values, and declining stock prices. However other experts suggested that immigration to the US and the rise of emerging economies would offset the baby boomer demographic impact. Still other experts postulated that, due to the 2008 major stock market decline and home equity crash, many baby boomers lost so much equity that they will retire at a later age than was previously planned.

Not all of these forecasts proved accurate. While the retirement of the Baby Boomer generation did coincide with the most severe recession in the United States since 1980, the subsequent recovery was strong, with the unemployment rate falling to 5% by the end of 2015. The stockmarket also surged in the 2010s, with both the Dow Jones and Nasdaq climbing to all-time highs as the decade wore on.

== See also ==
- Kondratiev wave
- Recession
