= Acsensorize =

Definition; act of adding a multitude of dissimilar sensors

Acsensorize (v.t.), pronounced as ac-sensor-ize, is the act of adding a multitude of dissimilar sensors, generally of a variety of sensing modalities, to an existing system that may or may not already have sensors;

- acsensorizing (pres. part.);
- acsensorized (past. part.);
- acsensorization (n.) is the process of acsensorizing.

It was first used by researchers at General Motors Global Research and Development, and was published in. The word was motivated by accessorize. Acsensorizing plays a significant role in big data research and machine learning.

== See also ==
- Sensorization
