= Alexander Sergeyevich Lappo-Danilevsky =

Russian historian and sociologist (1863–1919)

Alexander Sergeyevich Lappo-Danilevsky (Russian: Александр Сергеевич Лаппо-Данилевский; 27 January 1863 – 7 February 1919) was a Russian historian and sociologist.

He attended the University of St. Petersburg, graduating from the Faculty of History and Philology in 1886.

He played an influential role in introducing Nikolai Kondratiev to sociology, economics and scientific method.

He is buried in the Smolensky Cemetery.
