= Institute of Conjuncture =

The Institute of Conjuncture was founded in Moscow in 1920 by Nikolai Kondratiev as a center for the study of business cycles. As its first director, Kondratiev managed to develop the institute, from just a couple of scientists at its beginning, into an institution with 51 researchers in 1923. In 1928, the institute was dissolved after the New Economic Policy was replaced with a planned economy.

== History ==
The institute was organized in October 1920 by Nikolai Kondratiev following his arrival in Moscow following a brief stint in jail. It was at the Institute of Conjuncture that Kondratiev drew up his Five Year Plan for Agriculture. In the 1920s, the Institute of Conjuncture circulated the Economic Bulletin of the Conjuncture Institute which included an index of retail prices, economic indicators, and theoretical articles. Though the institute had few researchers at formation, by 1923 it had become a respected institution with fifty-one researchers associated with it. With the collapse of the NEP and the transition to a planned economy, the Institute closed in 1928.
