= Tessaleno Devezas =

- Born: Tessaleno Campos Devezas; 4 December 1946 (age 79); Rio de Janeiro, Brazil
- Awards: Elsevier Best Paper Prize (2002); Silver Kondratieff Medal (2004); Honorary Member of the International Kondratieff Foundation (2005); Honor Mention from Elsevier (2006)
- Scientific career
- Fields: Physics, Systems Theory, Materials Engineering, Energy Systems, Innovation and Technological Management and Technological Forecasting
- Workplaces: University of Beira Interior and Atlantic University

Tessaleno Campos Devezas (born 4 December 1946 in Rio de Janeiro) is a Brazilian-born Portuguese physicist, systems theorist, and materials scientist. He is best known for his contributions to the long waves theory in socioeconomic development, technological evolution, energy systems as well as world system analysis. Member of the World Future Society, World Futures Studies Federation.

== Awards ==
In March 2002, Devezas was honored with the "Elsevier Best Paper Prize 2001" for his paper proposing a model explaining the mechanism underlying the long economic waves (Kondratieff waves) and, in 2006, another of his papers (about the growth dynamics of the Internet) received an Honor Mention from Elsevier. In 2004, he was awarded with the Silver Kondratieff Medal by the International N. D. Kondratieff Foundation and the Russian Academy of Natural Sciences (RAEN) for his written contributions for the understanding of the Kondratieff waves, and, in 2005, he was honored as Honorary Member of the International Kondratieff Foundation.

== Selected papers on socioeconomic development and systems theory ==
The following list does not include this author's publications on materials science and engineering.

- The Biological Determinants of Long Wave Behavior in Socioeconomic Growth and Development, Technological Forecasting and Social Change 68 (2001), pp. 1–57 (with James Corredine).
- The Nonlinear Dynamics of Technoeconomic Systems: An Informational Interpretation, Technological Forecasting and Social Change 69 (2002), pp. 317–357 (with J. Corredine).
- Power Law Behavior and World System Evolution: a Millennial Learning Process, LAUR 02-5221, Los Alamos National Laboratory, August 2002. Published in Technological Forecasting and Social Change 70 (2003), pp. 819–859 (with G. Modelski).
- The Growth Dynamics of the Internet and the Long Wave Theory, Technological Forecasting & Social Change 72 (2005), pp. 913–935 (with H.A. Linstone e H.J.S. Santos).
- Evolutionary Theory of Technological Change: State-of-the-Art and New Approaches Technological Forecasting and Social Change 72 (2005) pp. 1137–1152 (special issue on New Horizons and Challenges for Future Oriented Technology Analysis).
- Evolutionary Theory of Technological Change: Discussion on Missing Points and Promising Approaches IIASA IR-05-49 (20 pages), December 2005.
- The Portuguese as System Builders in the XVth-XVIth centuries: A Case Study on the Role of Technology in the Evolution of the World System Globalizations 3 (2006) pp. 503–519 (with George Modelski).
- Political Globalization is Global Political Evolution World Futures 63 (2007) pp. 1–16.
- Energy Scenarios: Toward a New Energy Paradigm, FUTURES 40 (2008), pp 1–16m(with D. LePoire, J.C.O. Matias e A.M.P. Silva).
- Crisis, Depressions, Expansions – Global Trends and Secular Analysis, Technological Forecasting and Social Change 77 (2010) pp. 739–761.
- On phase transitions, catastrophes, and sudden changes, Technological Forecasting and Social Change 77 (2010) pp. 1412–1422.
- How Many Singularities are Near and How They Disrupt Society, Technological Forecasting and Social Change 78 (2011) 1365-1378 (with C. Magee).
- Technological Innovation and The Long Wave Theory, Technological Forecasting and Social Change 79 (2012) pp. 414–416 (with H. Linstone).
- The Struggle for Space: Past and Future of the Space Race, Technological Forecasting and Social Change, 79(2012) pp. 963–985 (with F. Melo, M.C. Salgado, M.L. Gregori, J. Ribeiro and C. Devezas).
- Influence of cable losses on the economic analysis of efficient and sustainable electrical equipment, Energy 65 (2014) pp 145 – 151.(with J.A. Lobão, and J.S. Catalão)
- Reduction of greenhouse gas emissions resulting from decreased losses in the conductors of an electrical installation, Energy Conversion and Management, 87 (2014) pp. 787–795 (with J.A. Lobão, and J.S. Catalão)
- Do R&D and licensing strategies influence start-ups' growth?, International Journal of Entrepreneurship and Small Business, 25 (2015) pp. 148–170. (with D. Pereira and J. Leitão)
- Energy efficiency of lighting installations: Software application and experimental validation, (2015) Energy Reports, 1, pp. 110–115. (with J.A. Lobão, and J.S. Catalão)
- A Changing Scenario: The NewSpace Agenda, Journal of Aerospace Technology and Management 8 (2016) pp. 5–7
- High-altitude platforms – present situation and technology trends, Journal of Aerospace Technology and Management 8(3) (2016) pp. 249 – 262 (with F. D’Oliveira and F.C.L. de Melo)
- A Simple Extension of Dematerialization Theory: Incorporation of Technical Progress and the Rebound Effect, Technological Forecasting & Social Change 117 (2017) pp. 196 – 205 (with C. Magee)
- Specifying technology and rebound in the IPAT identity, Procedia Manufacturing 21 (2018) pp. 476 – 485 (with C. Magee)
- Space Propulsion: a Survey Study about Current and Future Trends, Journal of Aerospace Technology and Management 10 (2018) pp. 1 – 23 (with M.C.V. Salgado and M.C.N. Belderrain)
- Innovation output estimation method for a national innovation system: application to the BRIC countries, International Journal of Multivariate Data Analysis 1(3)(2018) pp. 261 – 279 (with L.C. Pelicioni, J.R. Ribeiro, R.A. Scarpel, M.C.N. Belderrain, and F.C.L. de Melo)
- Near-Term Indications and Models of a Singularity, The 21st Century Singularity and Global Futures. A Big History Perspective (Springer, 2020)
- Aeronautics and Covid 19 – A reciprocal cause and effect phenomenon, Journal of Aerospace Technology and Management 12 (2020) e3420
- The struggle SARS-CoV-2 vs Homo Sapiens: Why the Earth stood still, and how will it keep moving on, Technological Forecasting & Social Change, 160, (2020)
- Trends in aviation: Rebound effect and the struggle composites x aluminum, Technological Forecasting & Social Change, 160, (2020) November
- Forecasting the labor intensity and labor income share for G7 countries in the digital age, Technological Forecasting & Social Change, 168, (2021) February, 120675, (with A. Akaev, Y. Ichkitidze, A. Sarygulov)
- On the global time evolution of the Covid-19 pandemic: Logistic modelling, Technological Forecasting & Social Change, 175, (2021) December, 121387 (with L.C.Miranda)

== Books ==
- Kondratieff Waves: Dimensions and Prospects at the Dawn of the 21st Century. Volgograd: Uchitel, 2012 <co-editor, with Leonid Grinin and Andrey Korotayev>.
- Kondratieff Waves, Warfare and World Security Editor, NATO Security Through Science Series E: Human and Societal Dynamics vol. 5, IOS Press, Amsterdam, March 2006. (ISBN 1-58603-588-6).
- Portugal: o Pioneiro da Globalização – Inovação e Estratégia na História Moderna with Jorge Nascimento Rodrigues, Centro Atlântico, V.N. Famalicão, May 2007 (1st ed.), August 2007 (2nd ed.). (ISBN 978-989-615-042-6).
- Pioneers of Globalization, Why Portugal Surprised the World with Jorge Nascimento Rodrigues, Centro Atlântico, V.N. Famalicão, December 2007 (ISBN 978-989-615-056-3).
- Globalization as Evolutionary Process – Modeling Global Change, G. Modelski, T. Devezas and W.R. Thompson (Eds), Routledge, London (ISBN 978-0-415-77361-4)
- Industry 4.0 - Entrepreneurship and Structural Change in the New Digital Landscape, Springer, Heidelberg, Germany, February 2017. (with Leitão J., Sarygulov. A, Editors) ISBN 978-3-319-49604-7
- Kondratieff Waves: Juglar – Kuznets – Kondratieff, Uchitel Publishing House, Volgograd, 2014. (with Grinin L.E and Korotayev A. V.) ISBN 978-5-7057-3287-6
- As Lições dos Descobrimentos – O que nos ensinam os empreendedores da globalização, V.N. Famalicão, June 2013 (Portuguese) (with Rodrigues, J.N.) ISBN 978-989-615-186-7
- A. Akaev, T. Devezas, A. Rudskoy (Eds.), Digital Transformation and the World Economy: Critical Factors and Sector-Focused Mathematical Models, Springer, Heidelberg, Germany, January 2022.
- I. Ilin, T. Devezas, C. Jahn, Development of Northern Sea Route and the Artic Maritime Logistics, Springer, Heidelberg, Germany, March 2022
- T. Devezas, J. Leitão, A. Sarygulov, The Economico Digital Transformation, Approaching Non-Stable and Uncertain Digitalized Production Systems, Springer, Heidelberg, Germany, January 2021

== Book chapters ==
- Long Waves and Warfare: an Enduring Controversy in T. Devezas (Ed.), Kondratieff Waves, Warfare and World Security Prologue, pp. vii-ix, NATO Security Through Science Series, IOS Press, Amsterdam, 2006.
- The Portuguese as System-builders: Technological innovation in early globalization, in G. Modelski, T. Devezas e W.R. Thompson (Eds), Globalization as Evolutionary Process, Chapter 3, pp. 30–57, Routledge, London, December 2007 (with G. Modelski).
- The Evolutionary Trajectory of the World System toward an Age of Transition, in W.R. Thompson (Ed), Systemic Transitions Chapter 11, pp. 223–240, Palgrave MacMillan, New York, January 2009.
- The Emergence of Modern Terrorism, in T. Devezas (Ed.), Kondratieff Waves, Warfare and World Security, pp. 245–252, NATO Security Through Science Series, IOS Press, Amsterdam, 2006 (with H.J.S. Santos).
- A New Approach to Globalization, in G. Modelski, T. Devezas e W.R. Thompson (Eds), Globalization as Evolutionary Process, Introduction, pp. 1–8, Routledge, London, December 2007. (with G. Modelski e W.R. Thompson).
- The growth of the Internet, long waves, and global change, in G. Modelski, T. Devezas e W.R. Thompson (Eds), Globalization as Evolutionary Process, Chapter 14, pp. 310–335, Routledge, London, December 2007 (with H.A. Linstone e H.J.S. Santos).
- World system processes: An evolutionary approach, to be published in UNESCO's Encyclopedia of Life Support Systems, in World System History, Ed. by G. Modelski and R.A. Denemark (with G. Modelski).
- On the Asymmetry of Economic Cycles, T. Devezas, J. Leitão, A. Sarygulov, Chapter 3 in Industry 4.0 - Entrepreneurship and Structural Change in the New Digital Landscape, Springer, Heidelberg, Germany, to appear in February 2017. (with Sokolov, V., and Rumyantseva, S.)
- Distribution and clusters of basic innovations, T. Devezas, J. Leitão, A. Sarygulov, Chapter 5 in Industry 4.0 - Entrepreneurship and Structural Change in the New Digital Landscape, Springer, Heidelberg, Germany, to appear in February 2017. (with Bolotin, M.)
- Global Pattern in Materials Consumption: An Empirical Study, T. Devezas, J. Leitão, A. Sarygulov, Chapter 13 in Industry 4.0 - Entrepreneurship and Structural Change in the New Digital Landscape, Springer, Heidelberg, Germany, to appear in February 2017. (with Vaz, A., and Magee, C.)
- The New Space Agenda, in R. Roycroft (Ed.), The American Middle Class: An Economic Encyclopedia of Progress and Poverty, ABC-Clio, Santa Barbara, CA, US, 2015. (with Ribeiro, J)
- Cyclical Dynamics in Economics and Politics in the Past and in the Future, Grinin L.E., Devezas T., Korotayev A. V., in Kondratieff Waves: Juglar – Kuznets – Kondratieff, pp. 5 – 24, Uchitel Publishing House, Volgograd, 2014. (with Grinin, L., and Korotayev, A)
- The Recent Crisis under the Light of the Long Wave Theory, in Kondratieff Waves, Ed. by Grinin L., Devezas T., Korotayev A., pp. 138 – 175, Uchitel Publishing House, Volgograd, 2012.
- Near-term Indications and models of a singularity trend. In: The 21st century Singularity and global futures. A Big History perspective. Springer, Cham, 2020, pp 213–224.
- A. Akaev, A. Rudskoy, T. Devezas, Rethinking theory on the role of technological innovation in economic development, in A. Akaev, T. Devezas, A. Rudskoy (Eds.), Digital Transformation and the World Economy: Critical Factors and Sector-Focused Mathematical Models, Springer, Heidelberg, Germany, January 2022.
- A. Akaev, T. Devezas, A. Tick, K - Waves and the innovation-technological paradigm of Schumpeter-Mensch-Freeman-Hirooka, in A. Akaev, T. Devezas, A. Rudskoy (Eds.), Digital Transformation and the World Economy: Critical Factors and Sector-Focused Mathematical Models, Springer, Heidelberg, Germany, January 2022.
- S. Chuy, I. Ilin, C. Jahn, T. Devezas, Northern Sea Route development concept, in I. Ilin, T. Devezas, C. Jahn, Development of Northern Sea Route and the Artic Maritime Logistics, Springer, Heidelberg, Germany, March 2022.
- T. Devezas, J. Leitão, A. Sarygulov, The Economics of Digital Transformation: Approaching Non-Stable and Uncertain Digitalized Production Systems, In T. Devezas, J. leitão, A. Sarygulov,The Economics of Digital Transformation: Approaching Non-stable and Uncertain Digitalized Production Systems, Springer, Heidelberg, Germany, February 2021
- A. Akaev, A, Rudskoy, T. Devezas, Social and Economic Consequences of Large-scale Digitization and Robotization of the Modern Economy. In T. Devezas, J. leitão, A. Sarygulov, The Economics of Digital Transformation: Approaching Non-stable and Uncertain Digitalized Production Systems, Springer, Heidelberg, Germany, February 2021
- A. Akaev, A, Rudskoy, T. Devezas, Technological Substitution of Jobs in the Digital Economy and Shift in Labor Demand Towards Advanced Qualifications, In T. Devezas, J. leitão, A. Sarygulov, The Economics of Digital Transformation: Approaching Non-stable and Uncertain Digitalized Production Systems, Springer, Heidelberg, Germany, February 2021
