= Technological revolution =

Period of rapid technological change

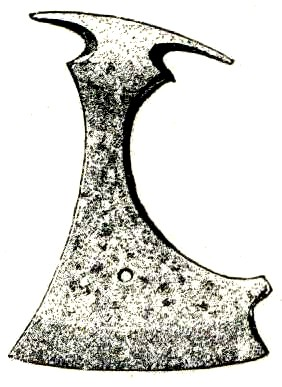
An axe made of iron, dating from the Swedish Iron Age, found at Gotland, Sweden: Iron—as a new material—initiated a dramatic revolution in technology, economy, society, warfare and politics.

A technological revolution is a period in which one or more technologies is replaced by another new technology in a short amount of time. It is a time of accelerated technological progress characterized by innovations whose rapid application and diffusion typically cause an abrupt change in society.

== Description ==
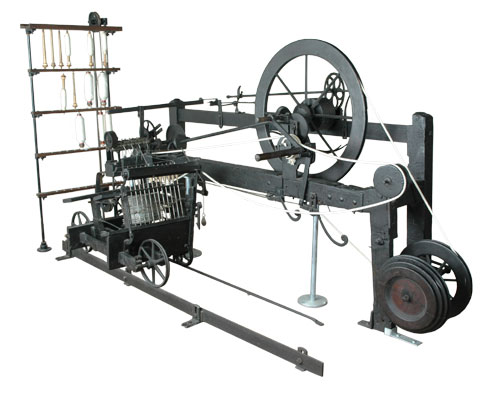
The Spinning Jenny and Spinning Mule (shown) greatly increased the productivity of thread manufacturing compared to the spinning wheel.

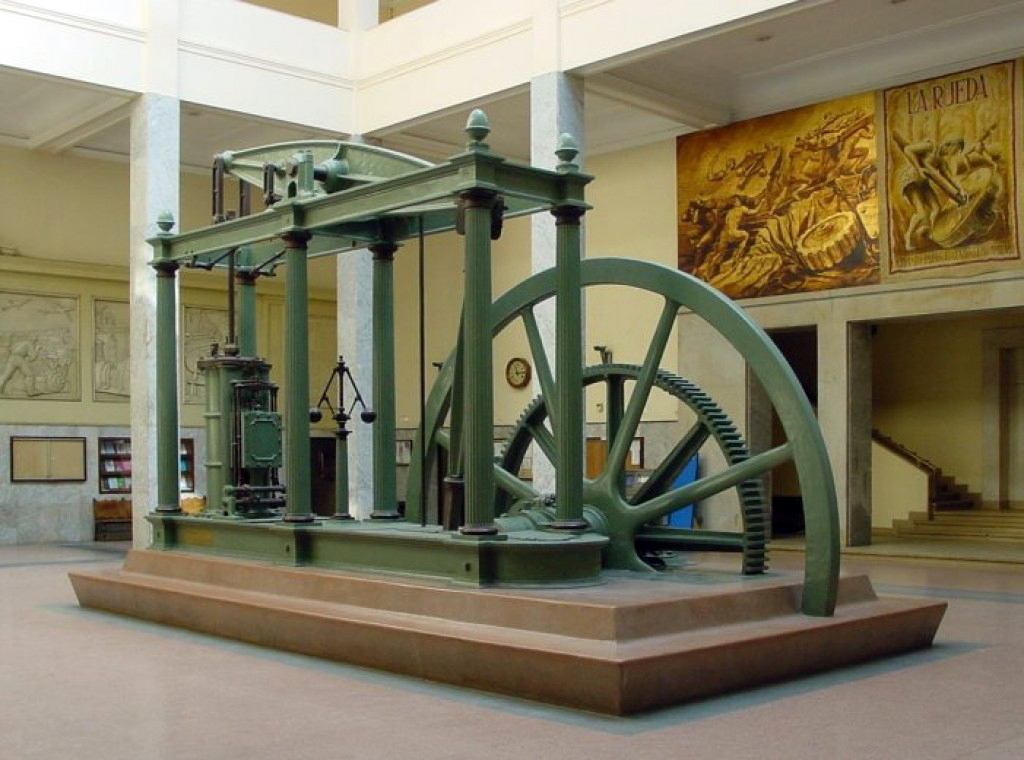
A Watt steam engine—the steam engine, fuelled primarily by coal, propelled the Industrial Revolution in Great Britain and the world.

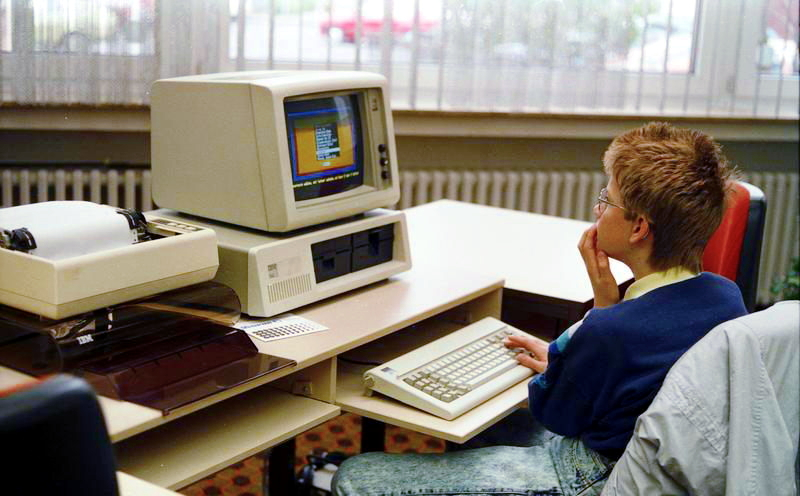
IBM Personal Computer XT in 1988—personal computers were an innovation that dramatically changed professional life and personal life as well.

A technological revolution may involve material or ideological changes caused by the introduction of a device or system. It may potentially impact business management, education, social interactions, finance and research methodology, and is not limited to technical aspects. It has been shown to increase productivity and efficiency. A technological revolution often significantly changes the material conditions of human existence and has been seen to reshape culture.

A technological revolution can be distinguished from a random collection of technology systems by two features:

1. A strong interconnectedness and interdependence of the participating systems in their technologies and markets.

2. A potential capacity to greatly affect the rest of the economy (and eventually society).

On the other hand, negative consequences have also been attributed to technological revolutions. For example, the use of coal as an energy source have negative environmental impacts, including being a contributing factor to climate change and the increase of greenhouse gases in the atmosphere, and have caused technological unemployment. Joseph Schumpeter described this contradictory nature of technological revolution as creative destruction. The concept of technological revolution is based on the idea that technological progress is not linear but undulatory. Technological revolution can be:

- Relation revolution (social relations, phones)
- Sectoral (more technological changes in one sector, e.g. Green Revolution and Commercial Revolution)
- Universal (interconnected radical changes in more than one sector, the universal technological revolution can be seen as a complex of several parallel sectoral technological revolutions, e.g. Second Industrial Revolution and Renaissance technological revolution)

The concept of universal technological revolutions is a "contributing factor in the Neo-Schumpeterian theory of long economic waves/cycles", according to Carlota Perez, Tessaleno Devezas, Daniel Šmihula and others.

== History ==
Some examples of technological revolutions were the Neolithic Revolution, the Industrial Revolution in the mid 1800s, the scientific-technical revolution about 1950–1960, and the Digital Revolution. The distinction between universal technological revolution and singular revolutions have been debated. One universal technological revolution may be composed of several sectoral technological revolutions (such as in science, industry, or transport).

There are several universal technological revolutions during the modern era in Western culture:

1. Financial-agricultural revolution (1600–1740)
2. Industrial Revolution (1760–1840)
3. Technical Revolution or Second Industrial Revolution (1870–1920)
4. Scientific-technical revolution (1940–1970)
5. Information and telecommunications revolution, also known as the Digital Revolution or Third Industrial Revolution (1975–2021)

Comparable periods of well-defined technological revolutions in the pre-modern era are seen as highly speculative. One such example is an attempt by Daniel Šmihulato to suggest a timeline of technological revolutions in pre-modern Europe:

1. Indo-European technological revolution (1900–1100 BC)
2. Celtic and Greek technological revolution (700–200 BC)
3. Germano-Slavic technological revolution (300–700 AD)
4. Medieval technological revolution (930–1200 AD)
5. Renaissance technological revolution (1340–1470 AD)

== Structure of technological revolution ==
Each revolution comprises the following engines for growth:

- New cheap inputs
- New products
- New processes

Technological revolutions has historically been seen to focus on cost reduction. For instance, the accessibility of coal at a low cost during the Industrial Revolution allowed for iron steam engines which led to production of Iron railways, and the progression of the internet was contributed by inexpensive microelectronics for computer development. A combination of low-cost input and new infrastructures are at the core of each revolution to achieve their all pervasive impact.

== Potential future technological revolutions ==
Since 2000, there has been speculations of a new technological revolution which would focus on the fields of nanotechnologies, alternative fuel and energy systems, biotechnologies, genetic engineering, new materials technologies and so on.

The Second Machine Age is the term adopted in a 2014 book by Erik Brynjolfsson and Andrew McAfee. The industrial development plan of Germany began promoting the term Industry 4.0. In 2019, at the World Economic Forum meeting in Davos, Japan promoted another round of advancements called Society 5.0.

The phrase Fourth Industrial Revolution was first introduced by Klaus Schwab, the executive chairman of the World Economic Forum, in a 2015 article in Foreign Affairs. Following the publication of the article, the theme of the World Economic Forum Annual Meeting 2016 in Davos-Klosters, Switzerland was "Mastering the Fourth Industrial Revolution". On October 10, 2016, the Forum announced the opening of its Centre for the Fourth Industrial Revolution in San Francisco. According to Schwab, fourth era technologies includes technologies that combine hardware, software, and biology (cyber-physical systems), and which will put an emphases on advances in communication and connectivity. Schwab expects this era to be marked by breakthroughs in emerging technologies in fields such as robotics, artificial intelligence, nanotechnology, quantum computing, biotechnology, the internet of things, the industrial internet of things (IIoT), decentralized consensus, fifth-generation wireless technologies (5G), 3D printing and fully autonomous vehicles.

Jeremy Rifkin includes technologies like 5G, autonomous vehicles, Internet of Things, and renewable energy in the Third Industrial Revolution.

Some economists do not think that technological growth will continue to the same degree it has in the past. Robert J. Gordon holds the view that today's inventions are not as radical as electricity and the internal combustion engine were. He believes that modern technology is not as innovative as others claim, and is far from creating a revolution.

== List of intellectual, philosophical and technological revolutions ==
Technological revolution can cause the production-possibility frontier to shift outward and initiate economic growth.

Pre-Industrialization

- The Upper Paleolithic Revolution: the emergence of "high culture", new technologies and regionally distinct cultures (50,000–40,000 years ago).
- The Neolithic Revolution (around 13,000 years ago), which formed the basis for human civilization to develop.
- The Renaissance technological revolution: the set of inventions during the Renaissance period, roughly the 14th through the 16th century.
- The Commercial Revolution: a period of European economic expansion, colonialism and mercantilism which lasted from approximately the 16th century until the early 18th century.
- The Price Revolution: a series of economic events from the second half of the 15th century to the first half of the 17th, the price revolution refers most specifically to the high rate of inflation that characterized the period across Western Europe.
- The Scientific Revolution: a fundamental transformation in scientific ideas around the 16th century.
- The British Agricultural Revolution (18th century), which spurred urbanization and consequently helped launch the Industrial Revolution.

Industrialization

- The First Industrial Revolution: the shift of technological, socioeconomic and cultural conditions in the late 18th century and early 19th century that began in Britain and spread throughout the world.
  - The Market Revolution: a change in the manual labour system originating in the Southern United States (and soon moving to the Northern United States) and later spreading to the entire world (about 1800–1900).
- The Second Industrial Revolution (1871–1914).
- The Green Revolution (1945–1975): the use of industrial fertilizers and new crops largely increased the world's agricultural output.
- The Third Industrial Revolution: the changes brought about by computing and communication technology, starting from around 1950 with the creation of the first general-purpose electronic computers.
- The Information Revolution: the economic, social and technological changes resulting from the Digital Revolution (after 1960).

== See also ==
- Accelerating change
- Automation
- Electrification
- Kondratiev wave
- Kranzberg's laws of technology
- List of emerging technologies
- Mass production
- Machine tool
- Mechanization
- Post-work society
- Productivity-improving technologies
- Innovation
- Technological change
- Technological unemployment
- The War on Normal People
- The Future of Work and Death
