= Technical definition =

Explanation of technical terminology

A technical definition is a definition in technical communication describing or explaining technical terminology. Technical definitions are used to introduce the vocabulary which makes communication in a particular field succinct and unambiguous. For example, the iliac crest from medical terminology is the top ridge of the hip bone (see ).

== Types of technical definitions ==
There are three main types of technical definitions.

1. Power definitions
2. Secondary definitions
3. Extended definitions

=== Examples ===
Aniline, a benzene ring with an amine group, is a versatile chemical used in many organic syntheses.

The genus Helogale (dwarf mongooses) contains two species.

== Sentence definitions ==
These definitions generally appear in three different places: within the text, in margin notes, or in a glossary. Regardless of position in the document, most sentence definitions follow the basic form of term, category, and distinguishing features.

=== Examples ===
A major scale is a diatonic scale which has the semitone interval pattern 2-2-1-2-2-2-1.

- term: major scale
- category: diatonic scales
- distinguishing features: semitone interval pattern 2-2-1-2-2-2-1

In mathematics, an abelian group is a group which is commutative.

- term: abelian group
- category: mathematical groups
- distinguishing features: commutative

== Extended definitions ==
When a term needs to be explained in great detail and precision, an extended definition is used. They can range in size from a few sentences to many pages. Shorter ones are usually found in the text, and lengthy definitions are placed in a glossary. Relatively complex concepts in mathematics require extended definitions in which mathematical objects are declared (e.g., let x be a real number...) and then restricted by conditions (often signaled by the phrase such that). These conditions often employ the universal and/or existential quantifiers (for all ($\forall$), there exists ($\exists$)).

Note: In mathematical definitions, convention dictates the use of the word if between the term to be defined and the definition; however, definitions should be interpreted as though if and only if were used in place of if.

=== Examples ===
Definition of the limit of a single variable function:

Let $f$ be a real-valued function of a real variable and $x$, $a$, and $L$ be real numbers. We say that the limit of $f$ as $x$ approaches $a$ is $L$ (or, $f(x)$ tends to $L$ as $x$ approaches $a$) and write $\lim_{x\to a} f(x)=L$ if, for all $\epsilon>0$, there exists $\delta>0$ such that whenever $x$ satisfies $0<|x-a|<\delta$, the inequality $|f(x)-L|<\epsilon$ holds.
