= Harry Dent =

American financial writer

Harry Shuler Dent Jr. (born May 12, 1953) is an American financial newsletter writer and businessman.

== Biography ==
Dent, born in Columbia, South Carolina, is the son of Republican political strategist Harry S. Dent Sr.

Dent is the founder of HS Dent Investment Management, an investment firm based in Tampa, Florida that advises, and markets, the Dent Strategic Portfolio Fund mutual fund. Dent is also the president and founder of the Dent Research and director of H.S. Dent Publishing.

Dent writes and markets an economic newsletter that reviews the economy in the United States and around the world by focusing on generational consumer spending patterns, as well as financial markets. He has written eleven books, two recent ones being bestsellers. His most recent book, The Sale of a Lifetime, was released in September 2016.

The basis of Dent's investment thesis, spending wave theory, is that consumer spending related to the generational formation of families has a profound effect on the market value of investments such as financial securities, real estate, and gold. Dent's spending wave theory posits that young adults spend little within the greater economy, and spending increases while they rear children. It peaks as children leave home and then slows during the last 15 years of working life (48–63). According to Dent, the decreased spending patterns of the current generation of U.S. baby boomers entering retirement will cause a pronounced downturn in the greater macroeconomy and an associated decline in the value of financial markets.

Dent resides in San Juan, Puerto Rico.

== Bibliography ==
- Zero Hour: Turn the Greatest Political and Financial Upheaval in Modern History to Your Advantage (2017)
- The Sale of a Lifetime: How the Great Bubble Bust of 2017 Can Make You Rich (2016)
- The Demographic Cliff: How to Survive and Prosper During the Great Deflation of 2014–2019 (2014)
- The Great Crash Ahead (2011)
- The Great Depression Ahead (2009)
- The Next Great Bubble Boom (2006)
- The Roaring 2000s Investor (1999)
- The Roaring 2000s (1998)
- The Great Jobs Ahead (1995)
- The Great Boom Ahead (1993)
- Our Power to Predict (1989)
