= Nikolai Kondratiev =

Russian Soviet economist (1892–1938)

- Николай Кондратьев
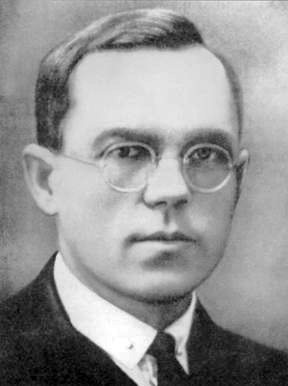
- Born: 4 March 1892; Galuevskaya, Kostroma Governorate, Russian Empire
- Died: 17 September 1938 (aged 46); Kommunarka shooting ground, Moscow Oblast, Russian SFSR, Soviet Union

Academic background
- Education: University of St. Petersburg
- Influences: Mikhail Tugan-Baranovsky; Alexander Sergeyevich Lappo-Danilevsky

Academic work
- Discipline: Macroeconomics
- School or tradition: Marxian economics
- Institutions: Institute of Conjuncture
- Notable ideas: Kondratiev waves

Nikolai Dmitriyevich Kondratiev (/kɒnˈdrɑːtiɛv/; also Kondratieff; Russian: Николай Дмитриевич Кондратьев; 4 March 1892 – 17 September 1938) was a Russian Soviet economist and proponent of the New Economic Policy (NEP) best known for the business cycle theory known as Kondratiev waves. Despite being a Soviet citizen, he was not a Marxian economist.

Kondratiev became an early leading figure of Soviet economics and promoted the NEP's system of small private free market enterprises in the Soviet Union. Kondratiev's theory that Western capitalist economies have long term (50-to-60-year) cycles of boom followed by depression gained recognition inside and outside the Soviet Union.

Kondratiev was condemned and imprisoned in 1930, but continued to work until his execution during the Great Purge in 1938. Some of his work was published, for the first time, posthumously.

== Life ==
=== Early life and education ===
Nikolai Dimitrievich Kondratiev was born on 4 March 1892 in the Galuevskaya, a village near Vichuga, Kostroma Governorate, into a peasant family of Komi heritage. Kondratiev was tutored at the University of St. Petersburg before the 1917 Russian Revolution by Mikhail Tugan-Baranovsky and Alexander Sergeyevich Lappo-Danilevsky. A member of the Socialist-Revolutionary Party, his initial professional work was in the area of agricultural economics and statistics and the problem of food supplies. On 5 October 1917, at the age of 25, he was appointed Deputy Minister of Food Supply of the last Alexander Kerensky government, which lasted for only a few days.

After the revolution, Kondratiev pursued academic research. In 1919, he was appointed to a teaching post at the Agricultural Academy of Peter the Great. In October 1920 he founded the Institute of Conjuncture, in Moscow. As its first director, he developed it into a large and respected institution with 51 researchers by 1923.

In 1922, he published his first writing on long cycles, The World Economy and its Conjunctures During and After the War. To provide proof that capitalist economies were subject to spontaneous and recurrent depressions and recoveries, Kondratiev did extensive price analysis of goods in the German, British, and French economies. Among the prices studied were raw materials and output products, interest rates, foreign trade, wages, and bank deposits.

In 1923, Kondratiev intervened in the debate about the "Scissors Crisis", following the general opinion of his colleagues. In 1923–25, he worked on a five-year plan for the development of Soviet agriculture. In 1924, after publishing his first book, presenting the first tentative version of his theory of major cycles, Kondratiev traveled to England, Germany, Canada and the United States, and visited several universities before returning to Russia..

In his 1924 paper "On the Notion of Economic Statics, Dynamics and Fluctuations", Kondratiev formulated, for the first time, his theory of long business cycles. Specifically, he made the following conclusions: 1. Prosperity years were most common in the capitalist economies during upswing periods. 2. Agriculture suffered more and long depressions than did industry during price downswings 3. Major technological innovations were conceived in downswing periods but were developed in upswing periods 4. Gold supply increased, and new markets were opened at the beginning of an upswing 5. The most extensive and devastating wars occurred during periods of an upswing(Mager, 1987, p. 27)

In 1925 he published his book The Major Economic Cycles, which quickly was translated into German. A short form was published in 1935 in the Review of Economic Statistics and for a time his ideas became popular in the West, until eclipsed by those of John Maynard Keynes.

Kondratiev's economic cycle theory held that there were long cycles of about fifty years. At the beginning of the cycle economies produce high-cost capital goods and infrastructure investments creating new employment and income and demand for consumer goods. However, after a few decades the expected return on investment falls below the interest rate and people refuse to invest, even as overcapacity in capital goods gives rise to massive layoffs, reducing the demand for consumer goods. Unemployment and a long economic crisis ensue as economies contract. People and companies save their resources until confidence begins to return and there is an upswing into a new capital formation period, usually characterized by large scale investment in new technologies.

Joseph Schumpeter credited the foundations of Long Wave Theory to Nikolai Kondratiev. He coined the term "Kondratiev Waves" (K-waves) in respect for Nikolai Kondratiev.

=== Support of the People's Commissariat ===
A member of the People's Commissariat of Agriculture and a proponent of the Soviet New Economic Policy (NEP) supported by Vladimir Lenin, Kondratiev was influential with writings about agriculture and planning methodology. Influenced by his trips overseas, he advocated a market-led industrialization strategy emphasizing export of agricultural produce to pay for industrialization, following the Ricardian economics theory of comparative advantage. He proposed a plan for agriculture and forestry from 1924 to 1928. However, after the death of Lenin in 1924, Joseph Stalin, who favored complete government control of the economy, took control of the Communist Party. Kondratiev's influence quickly waned.

According to the late Harvard sociologist Carle C. Zimmerman, Kondratiev was reported to Soviet authorities by a member of the University of Minnesota agriculture faculty in 1927 after a visit to sociologist Pitirim Sorokin:

Kondratieff (sic), an agricultural economist and student of business cycles, visited Minnesota in 1927 and stayed with Sorokin. A number of prominent American scientists were pro-communist at the time. One was a forester at the Ag campus where I had an office. He upbraided me for associating with Sorokin and Kondratieff and told me he was going to send a report about Kondratieff back to Russia. Later I learned that Kondratieff was arrested immediately after returning to Russia from the trip to see American universities. However, he was not given the final "treatment" until the Stalinist purges of 1931.

=== Fall from USSR directorship ===
Kondratiev was removed from the directorship of the Institute of Conjuncture in 1928 and arrested in July 1930, accused of being a member of a "Peasants Labour Party" (a non-existent party invented by the NKVD). Convicted as a "kulak-professor" and sentenced to 8 years in prison, Kondratiev served his sentence, from February 1932 onwards, at Suzdal, near Moscow. Although his health deteriorated under poor conditions, Kondratiev continued his research and decided to prepare five new books, as he mentioned in a letter to his wife. Some of these texts were indeed completed and were published posthumously.

His last letter was sent to his daughter, Elena Kondratieva, on 31 August 1938. In September 1938, during Stalin's Great Purge, he was tried, sentenced to death, and executed on the same day at the Kommunarka shooting ground. His relatives were informed that he was condemned to "ten years without the right to correspond with the outside world". He was 46 at the time of the execution.

== Legacy ==
In the 1970s, increased interest in business cycles led to the rediscovery of Kondratiev's work, including the first-time publication of a complete English translation of his seminal article "The Long Waves in Economic Life" in the journal Review (Fernand Braudel Center) in 1979 (the article was originally published in a German journal in 1926 and a partial English translation appeared in the journal The Review of Economic Statistics in 1935). This rediscovery of Kondratiev in English-speaking academia led to his theories being extended for the first time beyond economics as, for example, political scientists such as Joshua Goldstein and geographers such as Brian Berry extended the concept of Kondratiev long waves into their own fields. However, Kondratiev's theory remains controversial because, among other issues, of his ideas about the periodical character of the replacement of basic capital goods and the empirical possibility of coincidence in identifying long waves (i.e. that long waves are simply an epiphenomenon). Economists disagree about the length of cycles and their starting or ending points.

In 1987, the Soviet authorities officially rehabilitated Kondratiev. His collected works were first translated into English by Stephen S. Wilson in 1998. In 1992, on the centenary of his birth, the International Foundation N.A. Kondratiev was founded at the hands of Russian academics, Elena Kondratieva and Italian economist Giancarlo Pallavicini, at the time the first Western advisor to the Russian government for the reform of the economy, appointed vice president, along with Yurji Jacovetz, and Leonid Abalkin president

== Major works ==
- 1922 – The Grain Market
- 1922 – The World Economy and its Conjunctures During and After the War
- 1923 – "Some Controversial Questions Concerning the World Economy and Crisis (Answer to Our Critiques)"
- 1924 – "On the Notion of Economic Statics, Dynamics and Fluctuations"
- 1925 – The Major Economic Cycles
  - English version Nikolai Kondratieff (1984). Long Wave Cycle. Guy Daniels. E P Dutton. ISBN 978-0943940076.
- 1926a – "About the Question of the Major Cycles of the Conjuncture"
- 1926b – "Problems of Forecasting"
- 1926c – "Die langen Wellen der Konjunktur" (translated into English as "The Long Waves in Economic Life" in 1935/1979)
- 1928a – The Major Cycles of the Conjuncture
- 1928b – "Dynamics of Industrial and Agricultural Prices (Contribution to the Theory of Relative Dynamics and Conjuncture)"
- 1934 – "Main Problems of Economic Statics and Dynamics"

== See also ==
- Kondratiev wave
- World-systems approach
- Eugen Slutsky
- Information Revolution
