= Salomon de Wolff =

Dutch economist and politician

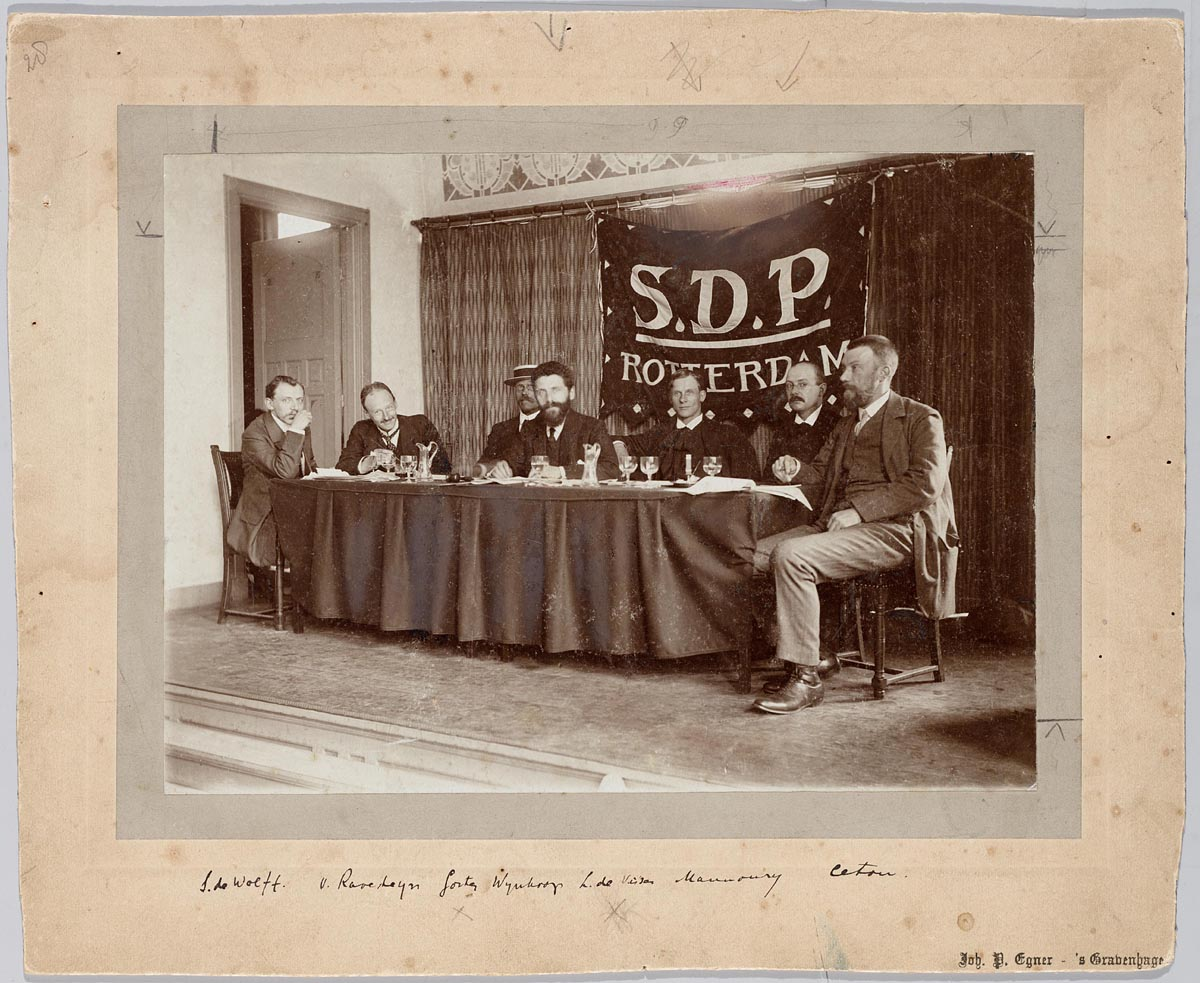
Sam de Wolff (left), 1911

Salomon (Sam) de Wolff (13 August 1878, Sneek – 24 November 1960, Amsterdam) was a Dutch economist and politician.

== External sources ==
- Salomon de Wolff at historici.nl (in Dutch)
