= Kamon =

Kamon may refer to:

- Kamon (name)
- Mon (emblem), also known as kamon (家紋), a Japanese heraldic symbol
- Kamon, a Biblical place
- Kamon, Israel, a village

== See also ==
- Camon (disambiguation)
- Kumon (disambiguation)
- Cimon (510–450 BC), Athenian politician and general
