= Church of Saint Michael v Jirchářích =

Coordinates: 50.0802°N 14.4181°E

Church of Saint Michael, nicknamed Church of Saint Michael v Jirchářích (Czech: Kostel svatého Michala v Jirchářích), is a church in the New Town district of Prague in the Czech Republic. It is located V Jirchářích street near the National Theatre, hence its nickname. It is the seat of Czech, Slovak and English congregation of the Evangelical Church of the Augsburg Confession in the Czech Republic. Its architectural style is not uniform due to alterations in different periods and styles. It is protected as a cultural monument of the Czech Republic.

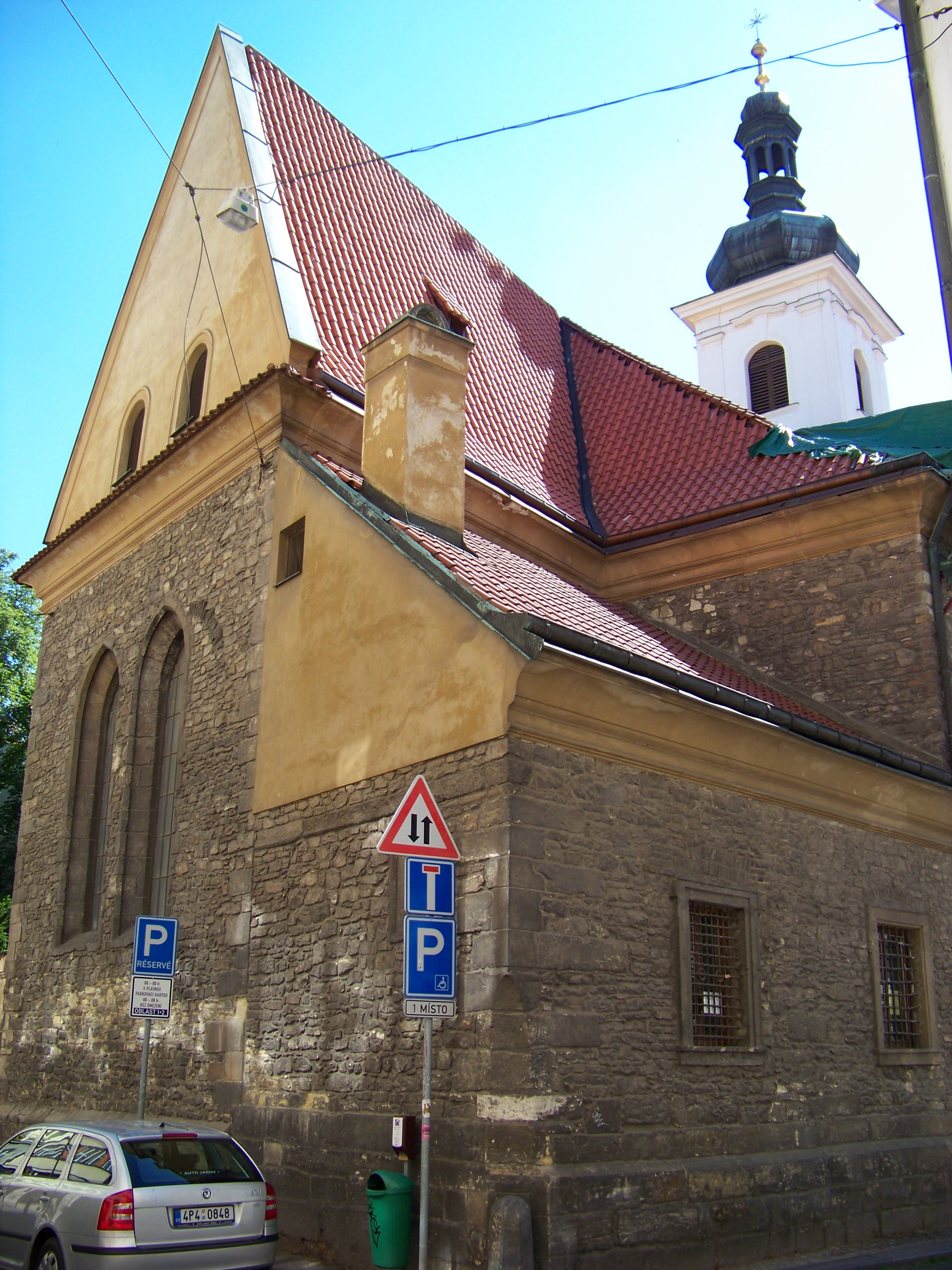
Façade of the church

== History ==
The first mention of the settlement is in the so-called foundation charter of the Benedictine monastery in Kladruby issued by Duke Vladislaus I in 1115. In that year the Benedictine monks settled here and built a settlement for the colonists called Opatovice. Therefore, it is now located near the church street Opatovická. The settlement apparently served as a being in middle point between the Prague castle and Vyšehrad. With the arrival of the colonists was built Romanesque church of St. Michael. Then the church served as a parish. In the 2nd half of the 13th century the church was assigned to the parish priest. In 1348 the settlement was included in the New Town, found by Charles IV and the church functioned as other parish churches of the New Town. Newtowners and a Prague archdeacon held the posting right above the church.

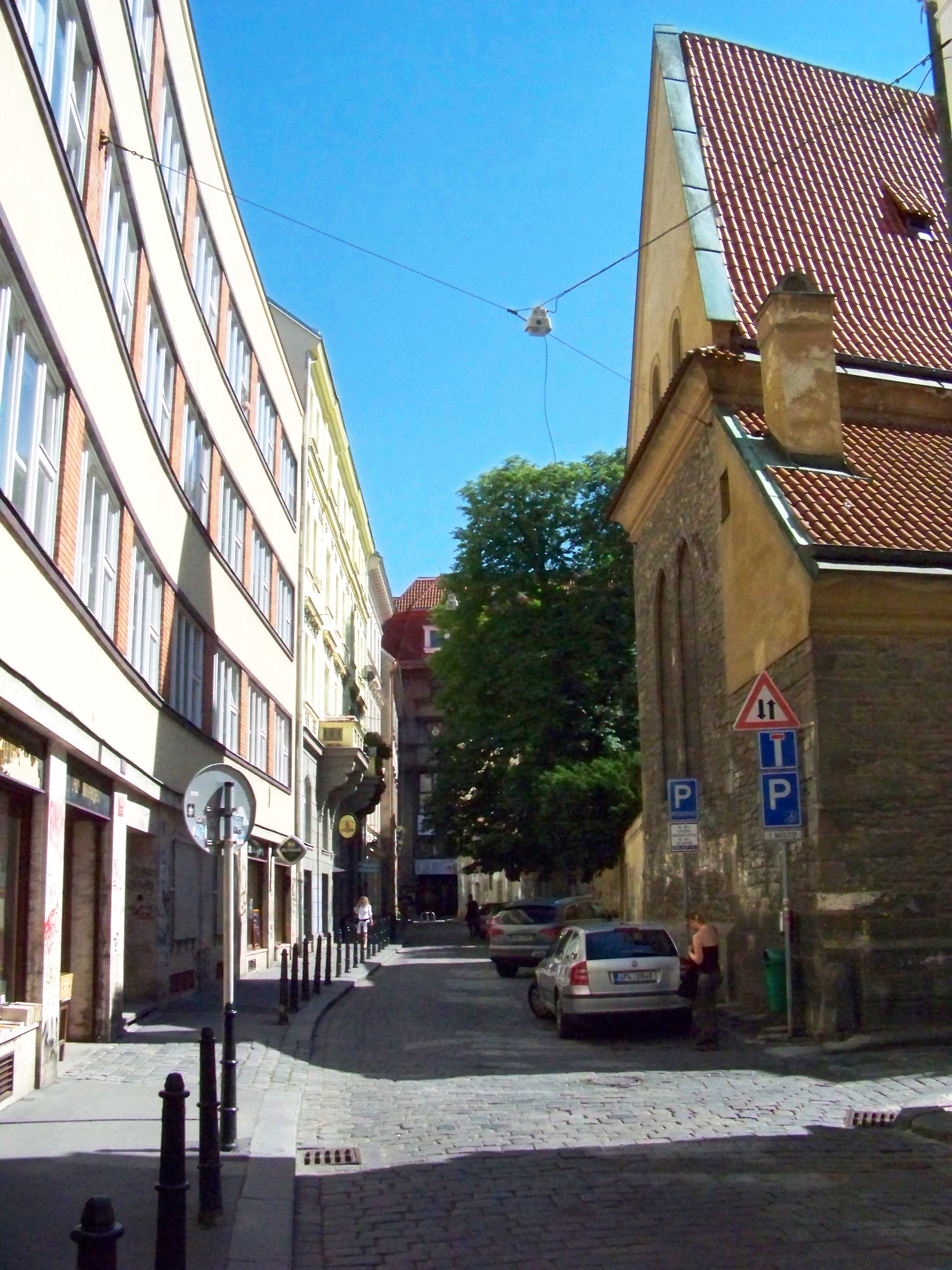
V Jirchářích street

=== Gothic and Renaissance reconstruction of the church ===
The Romanesque church was demolished and replaced by a Gothic church in 1369. The Gothic church was built with a tower in the west part, with a rectangular nave, trapezoidal presbytery with asymmetrical vault, which makes the temple very remarkable. In 1387 the church was extended by adding the northern side vaulted nave. The nave contains a window broken later above a portal, which was hidden in the hallway. In 1399 parish school was connected to the church. The south aisle of the eastern chapel was built before 1402. In the 15th century was documented connection between the church of St. Michael and Zbraslav Monastery. In 1511, there were vaulted a main nave and a south aisle. In the second half of the 16th century Renaissance builders added arc-form shield to the northern hall. A typical feature of the church was narrow, high, Gothic, sacred tower above the chancel and a brick corridor, which is supported by a wide arc. The hallway led from the singing choir to the house no. 152, where was a former rectory. The Protestant church managed until 1621, when the church came under Catholic Church. Then it lost the parish status and it was subordinated to a church Adalbert in Jircháře. The altar and tomb of the founder was built in the north aisle of the Central Chapel of the Crucified Savior and St. Mary Magdalene, thanks to Mary Magdalene Krechmerova. Also the sacristy was rebuilt. After a fire in 1717, when the church escaped with only a small blemish, builders began Baroque reconstruction.

=== Baroque reconstruction ===
During Baroque reconstruction there were bricked two Gothic windows in the presbytery. As a replacement, served two newly pulled oval shaped windows. The presbytery was equipped with the Baroque baptistery, which is still preserved today. Furthermore, the sacristy was arched, there was built a new staircase to the choir loft, which was also rebuilt. Adjustings of the northern hallway and portals followed. In 1722 the tower was reconstructed, which was the end of entire Baroque reconstruction. In 1770 there was added a new main altar.

=== 18th–19th centuries reconstructions ===
Emperor Joseph II ordered to abolish the church in 1787. Two years later it was bought by the Prague merchant Frantishek Kehrn. He sold the church in 1791 to the German Protestants. The church served as a chapel. However Protestants planned to destroy the church tower and rebuild exterior as a bourgeois house, because their houses of prayers and churches could not have towers. The same year was given them an exception and the tower was left at the church. Protestants contributed a new organ. Also there were added benches and chandeliers. Later, in 1817, the church was newly plastered and then was installed a pulpit. In the year 1838 was built a wall with a gate that on the west side protected space around the church. In 1882 was torn a northern hallway and a builder J. Blecha statically secured the entire object. In 1904 were created two western windows.

== Revival Gothic reconstruction ==
Newly Gothic reconstruction showed both eastern Gothic windows and a bricking Baroque presbytery and oval windows. On the same side was removed Baroque portal and revitalized Gothic window in the portal. Besides this portal, was discovered bricked Gothic window, which is almost the same as the window in the south chapel. The Baroque tower was covered with a new copper roof. The Gothic choir was stripped of plaster. In 1920 an organ gallery was reconstructed and expanded. Since the last renovation of the appearance of the church did not change much.

== Disposition ==
The building is built of a rubble masonry. The church was restricted by the street since the Middle Ages, that is why it has asymmetric three-naves. This fact derives its ground asymmetry.

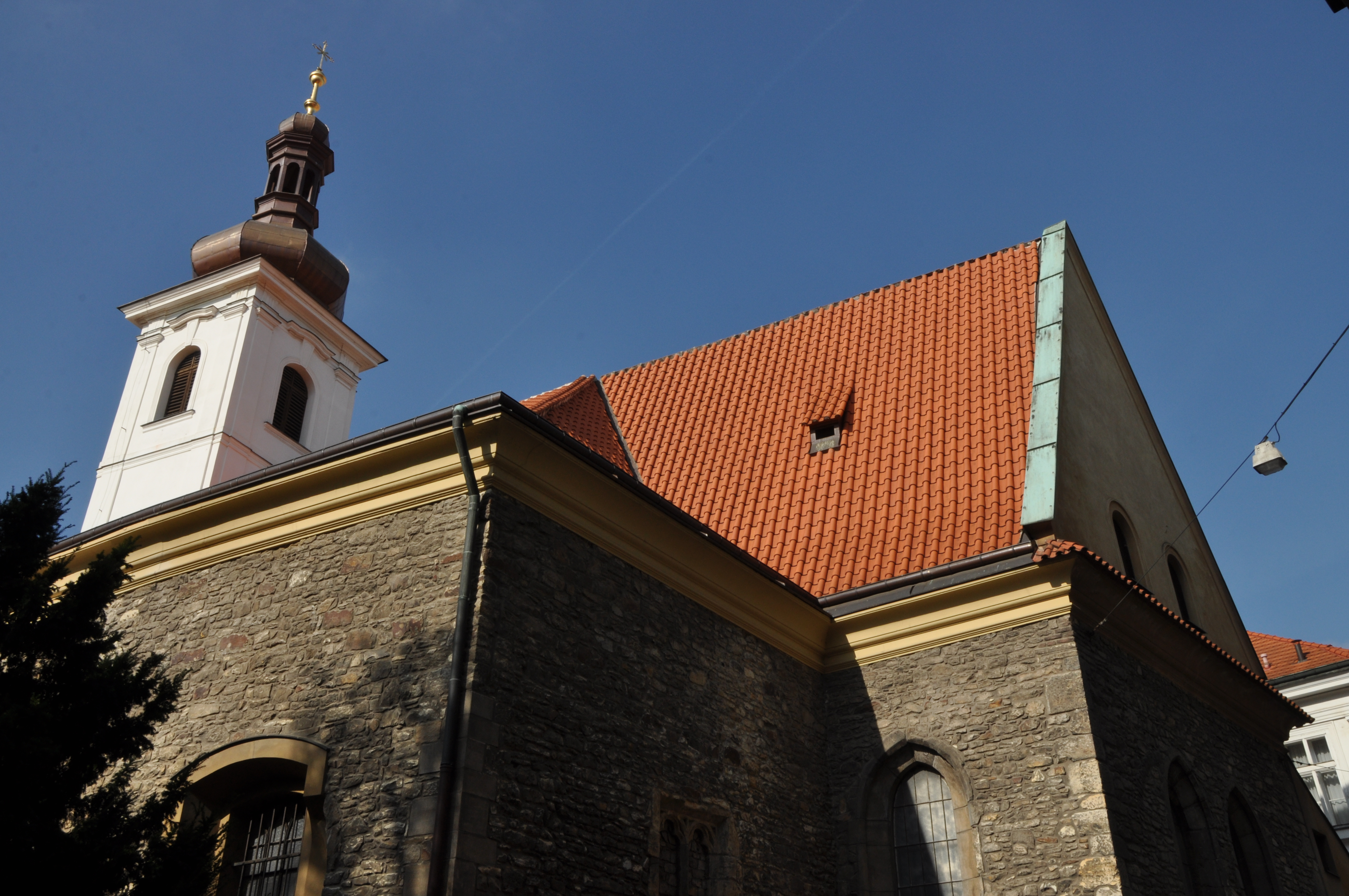
Church

=== Medium nave ===
The medium nave is vaulted by two-bays cross vaults. The vaults are supported by double fluted stone ribs. Rib vaults converge on multi-lobed brackets. In the eastern part of the nave brackets are drowned in the Baroque wall. The trapezoidal presbytery is connected to the nave on the east side. Its height coincides with the height of the central nave. The central nave defines a pair of Baroque arcades supported with pillars. In the middle of the nave arcades are drained massive stone pillars that seem to come from the late 14th century. Columns' tops terminate with Corinthian capitals. At the end of the 19th century's northern nave arched vaults with two cross pyriform ribs. Ribs grow from facing pyramidal consoles. The console in the middle of the north wall is a replica circa 1914. Bolts vaults are the target or circular type. Bolts adorn the coat tanners. On the northern boat continues on the east side chapel of St.Salvatora. The chapel is vaulted with placková vault with stucco mirror. Chapel corners are broken niches that culminates conches and pilasters frame. Pilasters carry peripheral cornice chapel. Above the niches in the corners are a motif stucco, crossed, laurel branches. The north nave and chapels are connected through high semicircular culminating in the arcade. The wall-pillar with leaf capitals and the entablature cover plate frame created by the nave for the connecting arcade. At the top of the arcade is located stucco cartouche with Veraikon.

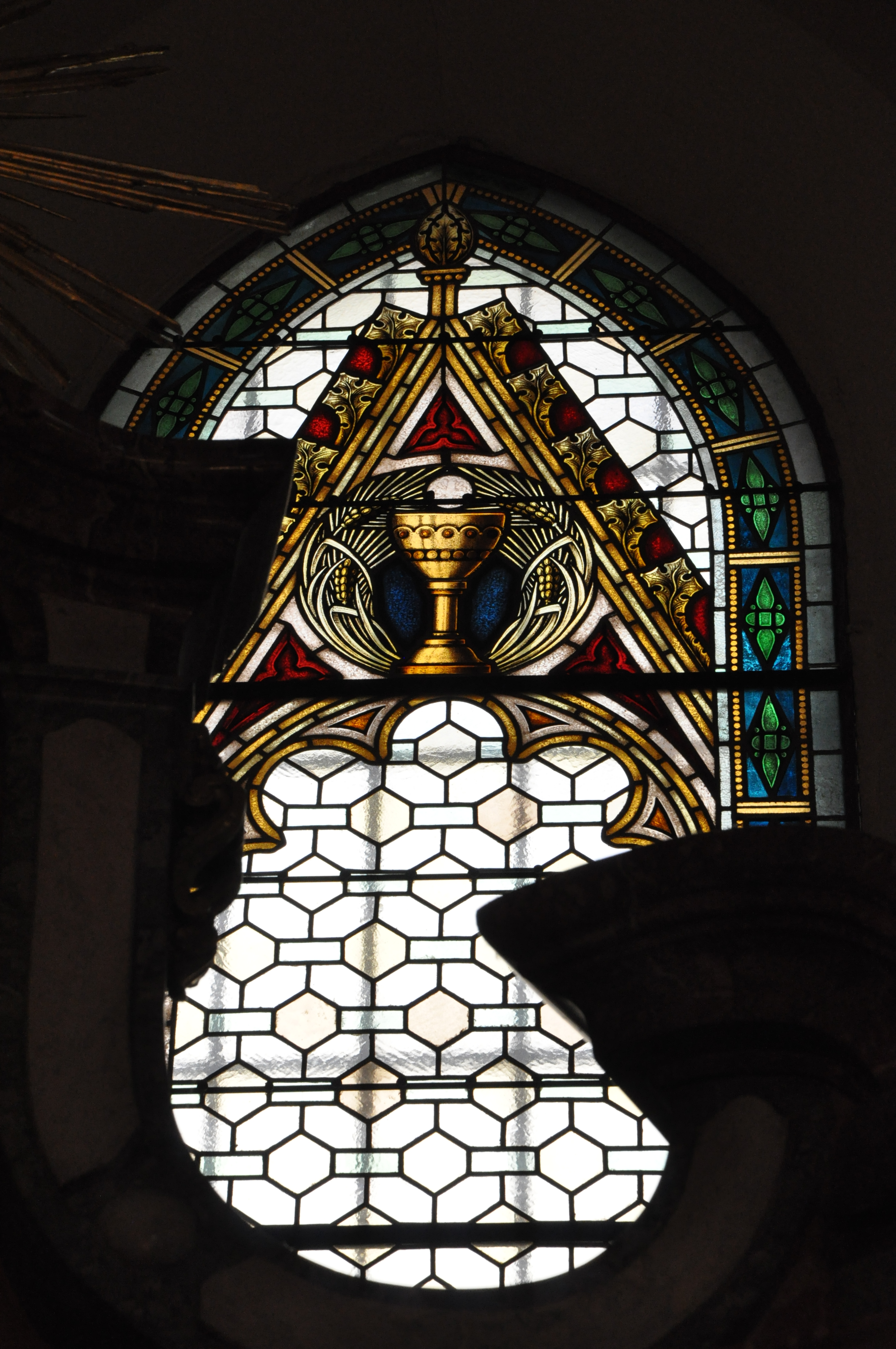
Window

=== South nave ===
An external support system based apparently on three additional operations with over-tile roofs aisle. Cross vaults with stone and twice mangered ribs span the space nave. Bolts at ribs are the same as in the northern aisle (undecorated, circular). Ribs do not end consoles mostly. In the northwest corner there is the only console left, the floor is covered with the embedded Baroque choir. High arcade opens the field to the east of the presbytery. In the Baroque period it served as the oratory window. The southern Gothic chapel nave overlaps the western part of the presbytery. The southern Gothic nave is adjoined extension with the Baroque staircase to the choir loft.

=== Presbytery ===
Its ground plan geometry consists of a trapezoid because of streets' restrictions. The width of the presbytery almost does not differ from the width of the main nave. The inner space creates interesting jump straddle vault with pear-shaped profile ribs. The entire space of the presbytery is vaulted by jumping vault. Because of this vault construction the church is considered as a unique Gothic architecture in Prague. Also other similar examples of this type of vault across Europe are younger. Vaults carry stone ribs with a pear profile. Ribs continue directly into the perimeter walls without any connection to the bracket. Interior space on the east side is also shaped by two high Gothic windows with partial stone mangered lining, which was supplemented with newly Gothic reconstruction. On the south side of the presbytery light flows through the third window similar to the eastern side. The windows are filled with colorful inside geometric stained glass. The same applies to the north nave. The great arcade on the west side opens the door to the adjoining southern chapel. On the opposite wall segmently ended, secondarily pulled down arcade meets Baroque chapel of St. Savior.

=== Sacristy ===
The sacristy is adjacent to the presbytery in the north, the road to it leads through a rectangular late Gothic portal with a stone profiled jamb. The portal is round out the cross-hatched design together with stonework mark on top. The portal demonstrates the fact that the sacristy dates from the late Middle Ages. The current sacristy was built in Baroque style together with the chapel St. Saviour. This proves reinforced overlay on the northeast corner, visible from the outside. The space of the sacristy is vaulted with two-bays of Baroque vault. In this space is the niche that is compressed oval arched. The chimney with architectonic top is one of the original features of the sacristy. The top of the chimney was rebuilt in the years 1914-1915. Rectangular sacristy windows are situated in the north. Above the northeast corner is situated a frame for painting (now empty).

=== The roof of the sacristy ===
The roof is saddle-type. It is covered with tiles. The roof meets in the east plastered Baroque shield.

=== Portals ===
The main portal on the north side accesses the entire three-naves. The Baroque portal is located on the side where it was formerly senior portal from the beginning of the 15th century. The modern Gothic portal dates to year 1914. Its basic geometry consists of a rectangle. It is made with a profiled planner lining. Double, cassette door portal is counted the same year as the construction site. The secondary setting Gothic tracery window creates a fanlight portal. Casting is done in a nice breaking into older masonry. The window is damaged, it has the center portion broken. A series of five nuns semicircular záklencích created tracery windows. Arches were made with mangered profiles of rods. This design of the window portal in the Czech Republic is very rare, but rather used as in France layout portals in the 14th and 15th centuries. The portal provides safeguards hall, which was demolished in 1882. The Gothic portal in the south aisle probably dates from the same period as the portal on the north side. However, it is executed in the traditional manner. Gently oblený záklenek portal is profiled cavettos. Záklenek was discovered in 1914 nad Baroque passage, which pointed to the stairs to the loft. The portal linked the southern nave with the house of so-called Oltářník (now No. 151)

=== Windows of naves ===
To three-naves space rays of light are flowing through segmented, vaulted in the Baroque style, windows. Four windows are located on the west side. Two high windows line the tower and are located above. Three windows are on the south side and two on the east. The windows on the north side lit chapel of St. Savior. In the western part of the northern wall is angled restored Gothic window (1914-1915) with Gothic mangered lining. Tracery windows disappear. The Gothic manger in the years 1717-1722 was replaced the Baroque. This process is now on the façade of the church are still visible, thanks to the survivors of the visible part of the Baroque segmental arches. On the east wall of the south aisle is more rectangular probably the Gothic window. The window that is performed again with tracery in which a pair of nuns. Similar was the window on the west wall. The window is now blind, but its remnants are seen lining alongside younger Baroque windows. The Re-Gothisation in the years 1914–1915 revealed on the south side of the church the torso pieces of three Gothic pointed windows, which were destroyed in the Baroque period.

=== Roof ===
Saddle pantile roof covers the entire three naves, together with the presbytery. The roof meets the east triangle Baroque shield. Historians believe that the core of the shield over the presbytery with new windows is Gothic.

=== Tower ===
Its basic geometry consists of a square shape. It is oriented to the west. Part of the tower is built of rubble masonry as well as three naves. One can get to its core from the north through a rectangular Baroque portal from 1722. The portal above the other hosts oval window. ordonov ledge of the tower follows the cornice of three-nave and the presbytery. The tower has a Baroque façade. From the corner towers on the façade relegated thirst with cornice capitals. They carry further dividing ledge. Above the ledge on lesenas abut Tuscan pilasters, which are part of the last rebuilt in Baroque floors. Former bell tower on the top floor was opened out four large semicircular windows crowned. The windows are lined with stucco shams with senior keystone. Elements window covers curved lintel cornice. In belfry is placed the bell made by Octave Winter from Broumov. The tower is ended with a copper onion dome with lantern.

== Interior furnishing ==
=== Choir ===
The organ gallery in the western part of the church is from Renaissance period, but it was rebuilt in Neo-Baroque style in 1920. It is placed instead of an old Gothic tribune. Its central wooden rail is white painted, the bottom part is decorated with carved floral decor in golden colour. The center part of the loft is connected to the side parts by two arcades. The loft has its own staircase, which leads from the exterior to the organ choir. It has a rectangular floor plan and the ground floor is vaulted. The staircase is lightened by two small rectangular windows and it has a simple portal.

=== Altars ===
The main altar was originally dedicated to St. Michael. It is a late Rococo altar, which was made around 1770. The church was also equipped with a side altar of Corpus Christi and the altar of Saints Peter and Paul. During the construction of the south aisle was built the east chapel, where is placed the altar of St. Marty.

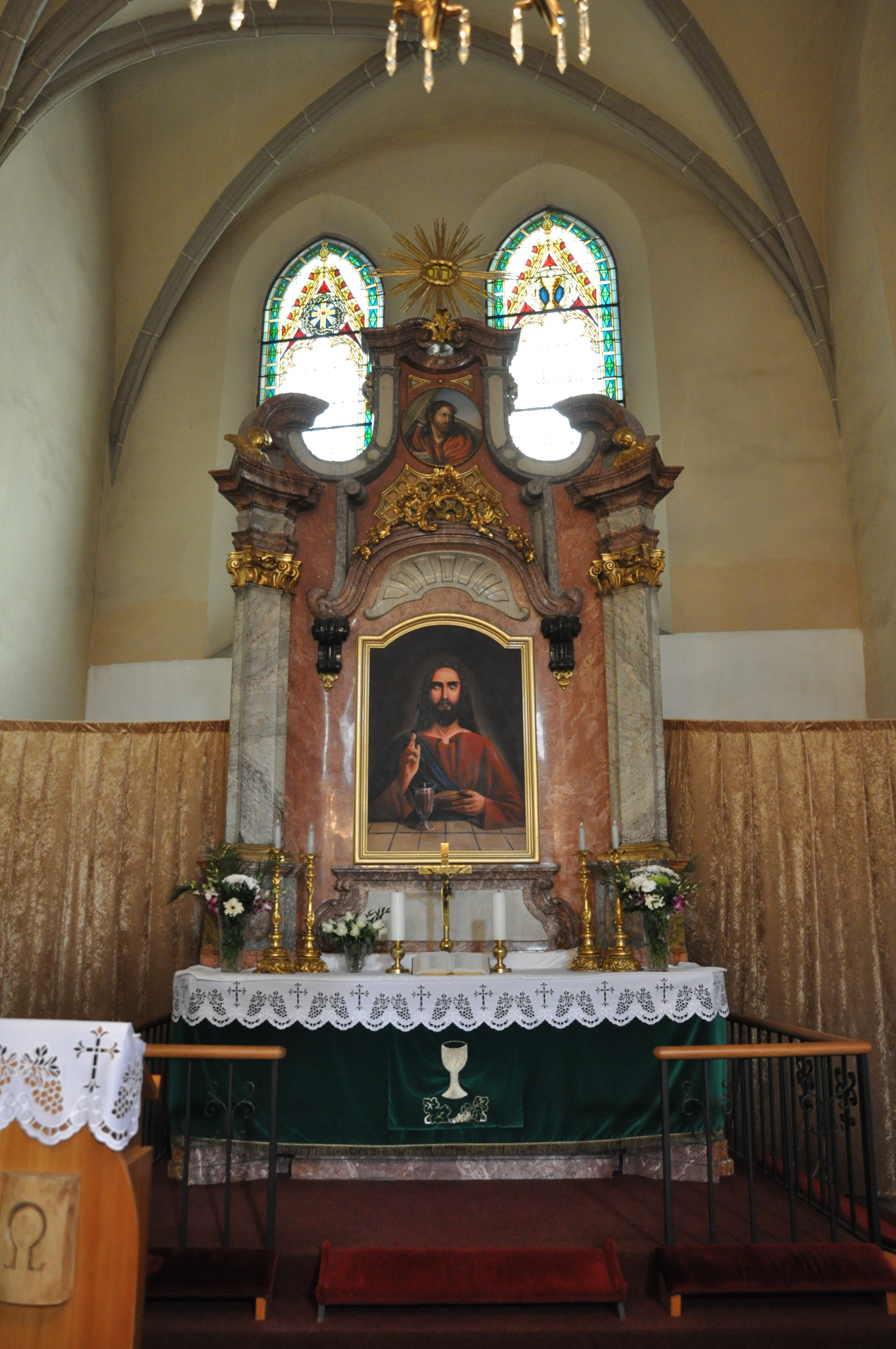
Altar

=== Pulpit and organ ===
The wooden white pulpit in Neoclassical style is decorated with floral and festoon ornaments.

The organ is from the second half of the 19th century. It is located on the organ gallery.

== Sepulchral monuments ==
The figural tombstone of Kristýna Popelová of Vesec, who died in 1522, is located in the base of the staircase that leads to the organ gallery. Other marble gravestones are installed in the west wall of the nave under the organ loft. These tomb stones belong to Jan Šturma, who died in 1568 and Alžběta Malovcová of Cheynov, who died in 1620. There is a garden close to the church, which is planned to be opened for the public in future. It the area of today´s garden is documented the existence of the cemetery in the year 1381.
