= Camon =

Camon may refer to:

Places

- Camon, Ariège, a commune in the Midi-Pyrénées region of southern France
- Camon, Somme, a commune in the Picardie region of northern France
- Camon (biblical place), a biblical location in Gilead

Other

- Camon (surname)
- Camon, a common name for Oenocarpus bacaba, a fruiting palm tree native to South America

== See also ==
- Kamon (disambiguation)
