= Kumon (disambiguation) =

Kumon is an educational network and a teaching method created by the Japanese educator Toru Kumon (1914–1995). It may also refer to

- Kumon Leysin Academy of Switzerland, an associated school
- Hiroaki Kumon (born 1966), Japanese football player
- Katsuhiko Kumon (born 1992), Japanese baseball player

== See also ==
- Camon (disambiguation)
- Kamon (disambiguation)
