= Tall Zira'a =

Archaeological site in Jordan

- تلّ زَرعة (Arabic)
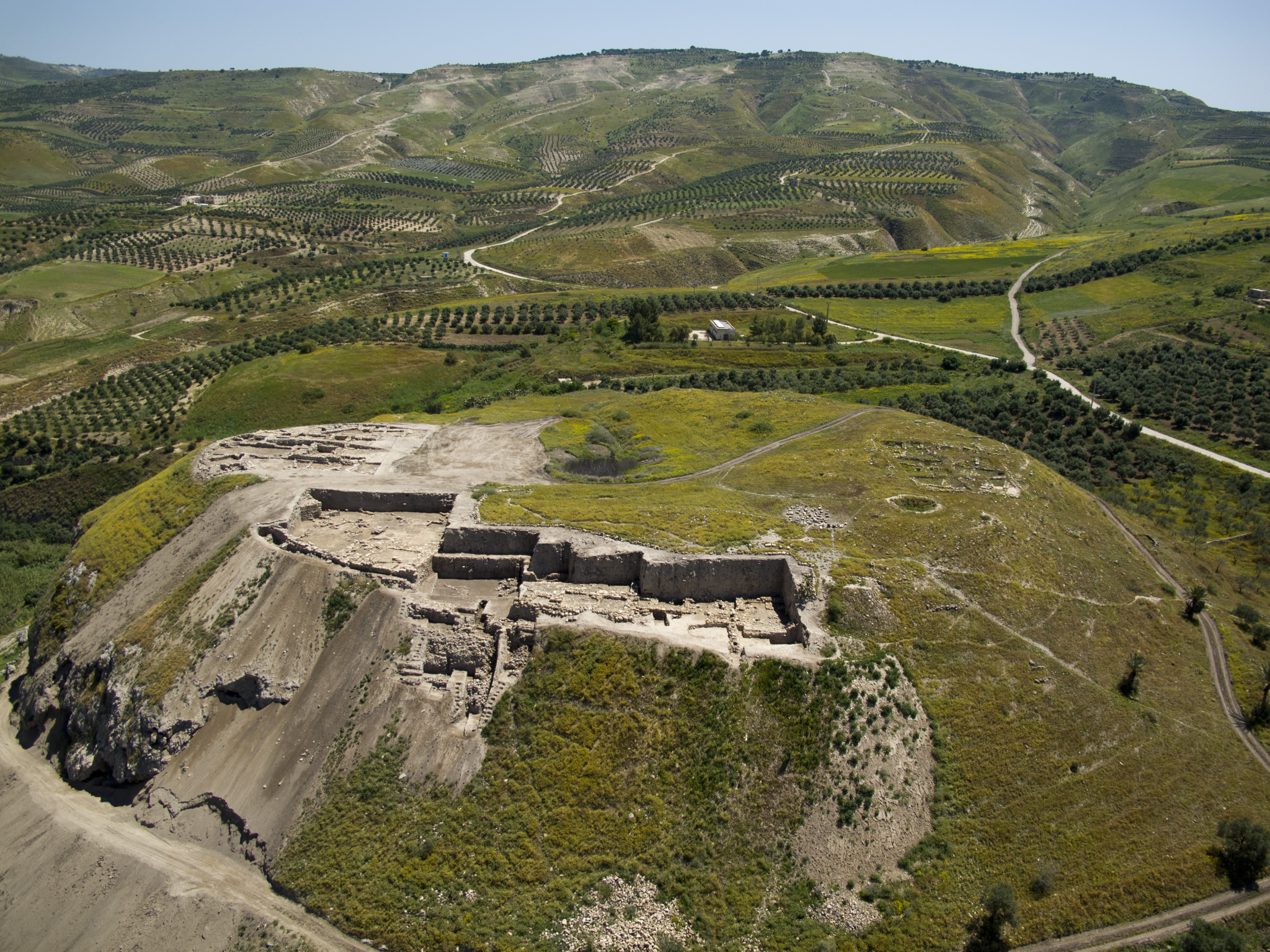
- Tall Zira'a in 2011

- Location within Jordan
- 32°37′15″N 35°39′22″E
- Type: Settlement
- Location: Irbid Governorate, Jordan
- Region: Levant

Site notes
- Excavation dates: 2001-2015
- Archaeologists: Dieter Vieweger, Jutta Häser
- Condition: In ruins

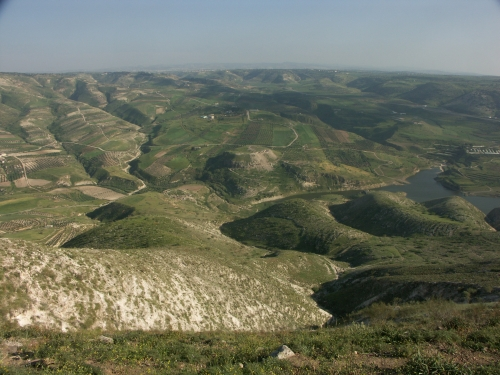
The Wadi el-'Arab and the Tall Zira'a in Spring 2007

The Tall Zira'a (also Tell Zera'a and Tall Zar‘a) (Arabic: تلّ زَرعة) is an archaeological tell in Jordan. Surveys and geophysical investigations showed the site's great potential for excavations.

Tall Zira´a contains evidence of over 5000 years of settlement – almost without cultural gaps, at the point at which the Syrian cultural sphere meets the Palestinian. Its almost continuous stratigraphy from Early Bronze Age to the Islamic periods can possibly demonstrate the history of northeast Jordan. Tall Zira'a lies about 4.5 kilometres (2.8 mi) south-west of the ancient Decapolis city of Gadara and is situated at the confluence of the Wadi el-'Arab and its tributary, the Wadi az-Zahar.

== The Tall ==
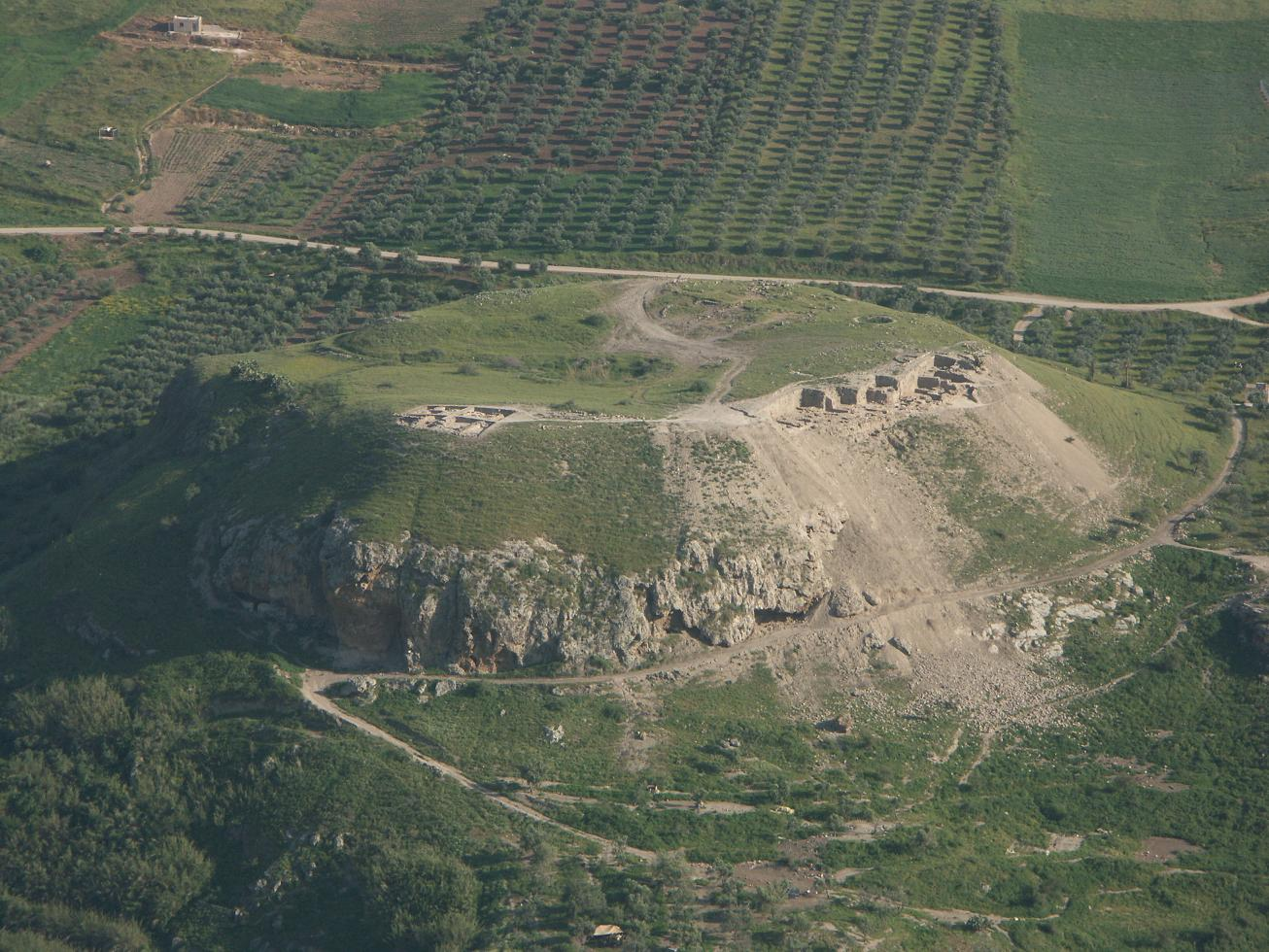
The Tall Zira'a 2007

The site rises about 25 metres (82 ft) above the surrounding area. The settlements were built on top of a natural limestone hill, which has a dimension of about 240 metres (790 ft) in diameter at its base. The plateau measures 160 metres (520 ft) in diameter. The cultural layers are between 12 metres (39 ft) and 15 metres (49 ft) thick.

An artesian well is located in the centre of the hill, which used to provide water in abundance, but dried up rapidly in the last years due to excessive pumping by the owners of the surrounding olive tree plantations. The hill is protected by sheer rock faces on its east and north sides. The south flank of the tall offers the best opportunity to overcome the 22–25 m difference in altitude comfortably via a 150 metres (490 ft) long, ascending track from west to east.

One terrace is located on the western, the other on the northern base of the tall. Both areas were protected by deep truncations into the Wadi el-'Arab. They served as lower cities near the wadi. However, the north terrace was recently bulldozed for a new olive orchard, and the archaeological remains have thus been seriously disturbed.

== Archaeology 2001-2026 ==
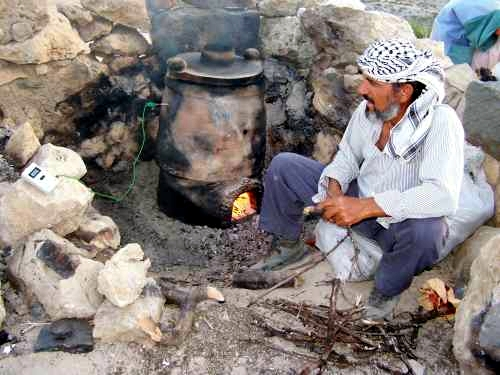
Experimental Archaeology 2006 - Part of the Gadara Region Project

In 1885, Gottlieb Schumacher surveyed the Wadi el-'Arab and mentioned Tall Zira'a. Nelson Glueck visited the Tall Zira'a in 1942. In March 1978, a two-day archaeological rescue investigation was initiated by the Department of Antiquities into the course of the Wadi el-'Arab dam project. In September 1983, this was followed up by a brief archaeological survey supervised by J. W. Hanbury-Tenison in the Wadi el-'Arab.

The 2000s excavations are part of the “Gadara Region Project” – an interdisciplinary study of the regional history of Gadara. The long-term archaeological project (2001–2015) investigates the Wadi el-'Arab region, which extends over 25 square kilometres (9.7 sq mi). In August 2001, a survey on Tall Zira'a (5.88 hectares (14.5 acres)) and in its surroundings was conducted by the Biblical Archaeological Institute Wuppertal, directed by Dieter Vieweger. In September 2003, he started the first excavation campaign. Since 2004, the project has continued with two campaigns a year as a co-operative project of the Biblical Archaeological Institute Wuppertal and the German Protestant Institute of Archaeology (Deutsches Evangelisches Institut für Altertumswissenschaft des Heiligen Landes (DEI)) in Amman (since 2006 also Jerusalem), directed by Vieweger and Jutta Häser.

=== Areas I-III (2003-2008) ===
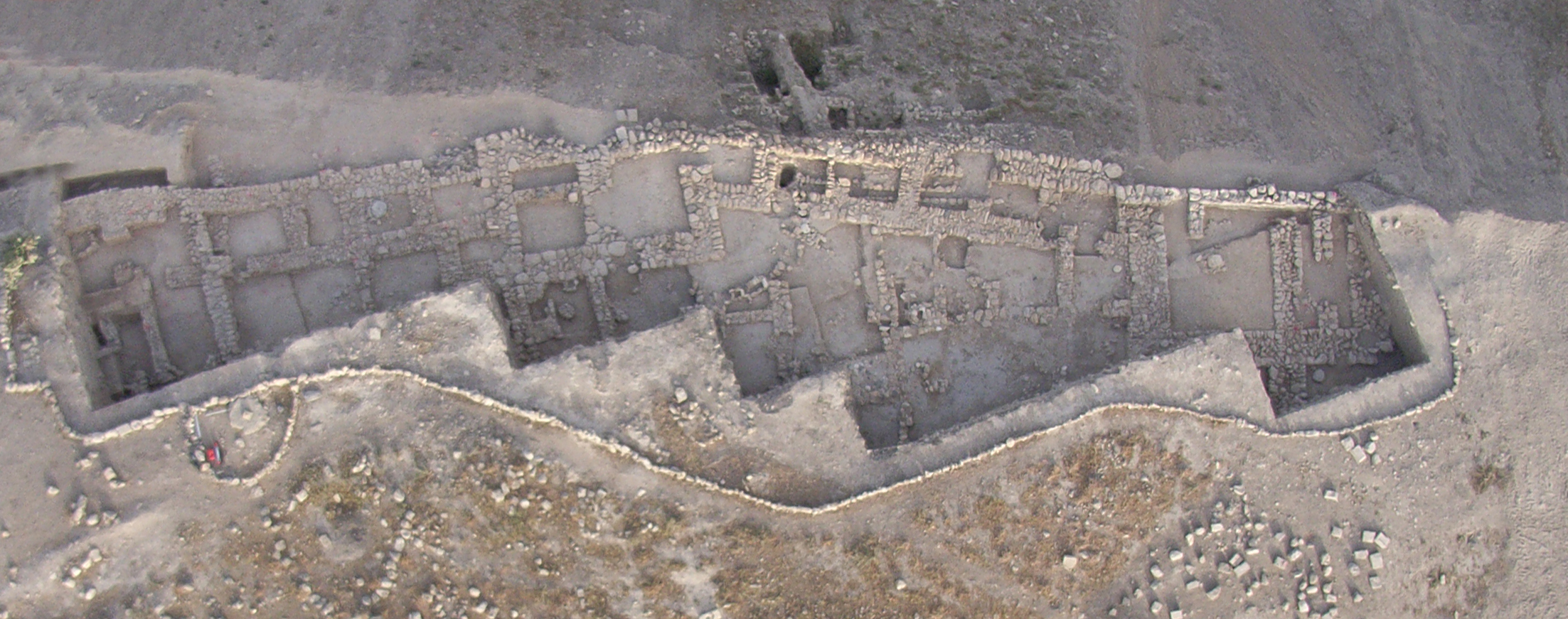
Area I in Spring 2008 (1100 sqm)

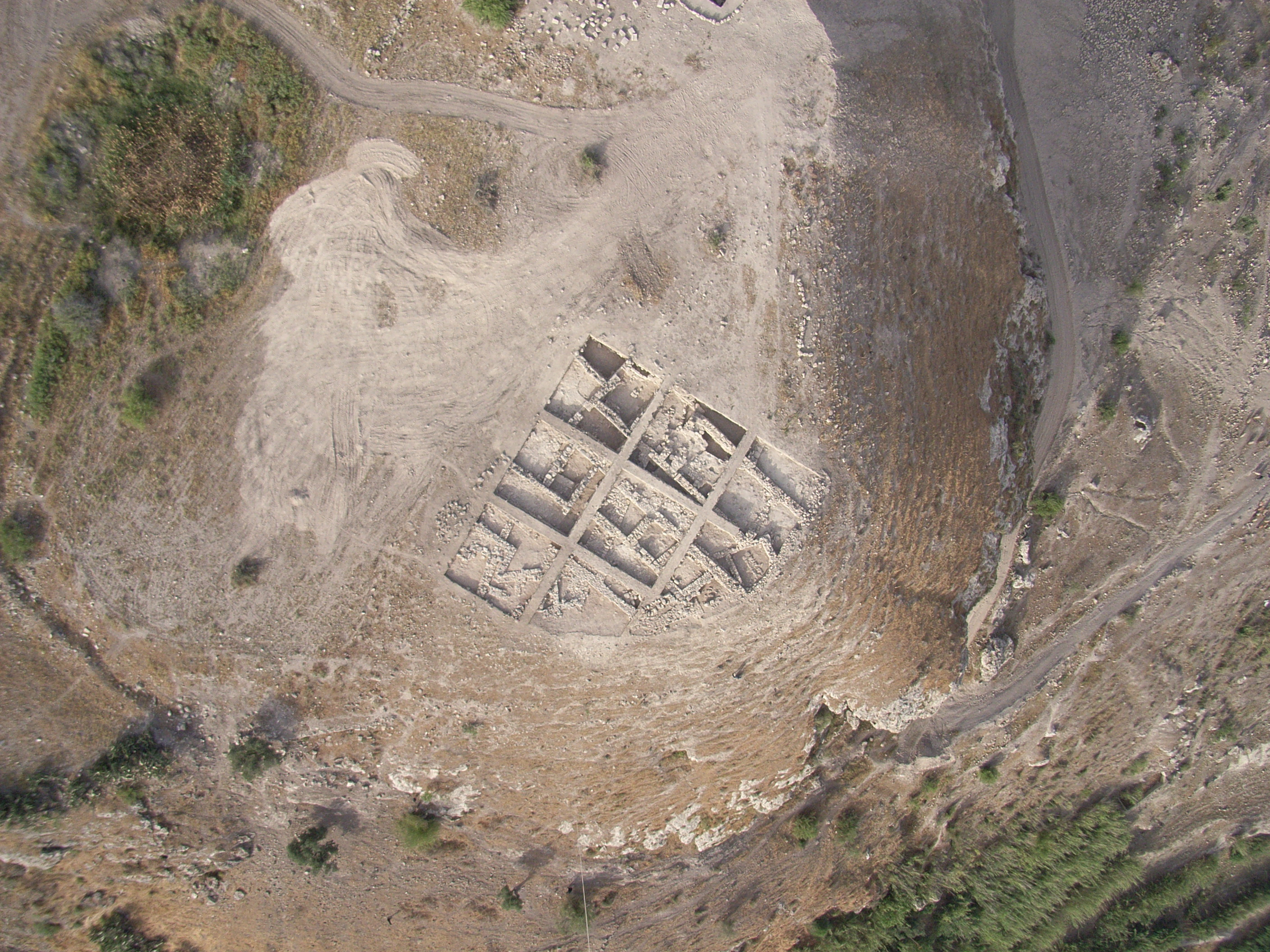
Area II in Spring 2008 (825 sqm)

Area I Natural settings and geophysical investigations showed that the west slope of the tall was a promising site to rapidly expose the stratigraphy of the tall. Accordingly, Area I was opened in 2003 and enlarged in spring 2008 to 1,100 square metres (12,000 sq ft). In all of the area excavated, a depth of 4.5 metres (15 ft) of the proposed 12 metres (39 ft) of cultural layers is reached. The youngest Late Bronze Age Level is completely uncovered.

Area II A second area was opened in spring 2006. It is located on one of the highest points of the plateau and is protected by a steep slope to the north. This prominent position is the most outstanding location on the tall. It was chosen because of its potential for yielding administrative and/or cultic buildings. The area was enlarged in spring 2008 to 825 square metres (8,880 sq ft). Up to now a large Roman-Byzantine Dwelling Complex with several building phases was exposed.

Area III The third excavation area was prepared for test excavation in the south of the tall in 2007. There is a Roman-Byzantine villa rustica (in an oriental version) expected. In a test trench (5 m x 1 m) excavated in 2007, a paved floor of the Roman Villa with a door way, a door hinge stone (out of context) and a water collecting basin near the door way (in situ) came to light. A large cistern (11 m x 6 m x 5.75 m) accessible through a hole in the roof, has already been explored in 2001. Its inner surface is covered by an eight centimetre thick plaster lining.

=== Summary of the results until spring 2008 ===
- Early Bronze Age
  - City wall, Test trench on the western slope
- Middle Bronze Age
  - At least two strata, habitation, test trench on the western slope
- Late Bronze Age
  - At least three strata
  - Middle stratum,
  - City wall, water channel - Excavation
  - Latest stratum 1450–1300 BCE (C14 dated)
  - Casemate wall, tower with sanctuary, gate, water channels, three residential buildings, two monumental representative building with a hoard of 23+5 cylinder seals, silver pendant, scarabs, beads etc. - Excavation
- Iron I 12th–11th century BCE (C14 dated)
  - Two large buildings (a "four room house" and a courtyard house) and agricultural activities (silos, huts, stables) - Excavation
- Iron II 10th–8th century BCE (C14 dated)
  - Fortified city, “zigzag wall”, buildings in an agglomerated system, workshops - Excavation
- Late Hellenistic-Early Roman
  - Pits - Excavation
- Roman-Byzantine(-Umayyad) 1st–7th century CE
  - Large, densely inhabited site; Villa rustica; (later) also fortified - Excavation
- Middle Islamic
  - Some houses and agricultural activities-Survey
- Late Islamic
  - Some houses and agricultural activities-Survey
- Ottoman
  - Some houses and agricultural activities-Report of Schumacher

== History ==
The second volume of the excavation report presents finds from strata 25 and 17 of Tall Zira'a, which document the settlement of the tell between the Early Bronze Age II III and the Middle Bronze Age IIB. A landslide destroyed the western part of the settlement during strata 16, 1500 BC; however, an area of approximately 120 m² in the center of area I was unaffected, allowing significant architectural evidence from that period to be excavated.

=== Early Bronze Age ===
The survey of the tall showed a high concentration of Early Bronze Age pottery in Area I. However, only the outer layer of a massive 2.2 m high Early Bronze Age fortification wall could be excavated in the step trench beyond the Late Bronze Age city wall.

- Early Bronze II
- Early Bronze III

=== Middle Bronze Age ===
==== Middle Bronze II ====
So far, the remains of two Middle Bronze Age strata with residential buildings have been uncovered in the same part of Area I, 2 m below the Late Bronze Age casemate wall. It is not yet possible to draw firm conclusions about the Middle Bronze Age culture before the unexcavated Late Bronze Age level and additional strata have been investigated. The site provides an opportunity to examine the transition from the Middle to the Late Bronze Age in northern Jordan.

- Middle Bronze IIB

=== Late Bronze Age ===
==== Late Bronze II ====
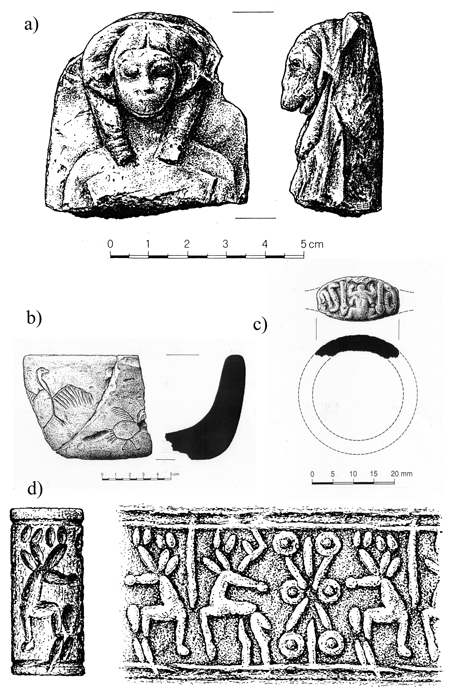
Finds from the Tall Zira'a 2007

In the Late Bronze Age (14th–13th century BCE), at least three settlements existed on the tall. For the time being, only the latest Late Bronze Age stratum could be exposed. Several observations indicate that the tall was the centre of a Late Bronze Age city state: The strong fortifications, the massive architecture, the high percentage (5%) of imported pottery from Cyprus and Greece as well as the numerous noteworthy single finds. The most remarkable building of this stratum is the massive casemate wall which fortified the settlement at the north-west flank. A charcoal sample from the collapsed walls gave a radio-carbon date between 1450 and 1300 BCE with 95.4% probability. Six rooms in the casemate wall could be excavated. Three drainage channels from the residential area end in one of the casemates – originally covered with flat stone slabs. At this point, the water flowed into a semicircular basin from where it drained into a deep, almost circular shaft lined with undressed stones. The three channels substitute an older channel from the middle Late Bronze Age stratum which was covered by the casemates of the city wall of the younger Late Bronze Age stratum. South of the casemate wall a large tower was uncovered. This inward-built tower was divided into two rooms paved with small pebbles. The northern room was connected to the southern part of the casemate wall. It was probably used by the guard. In a later building phase, the southern room was divided by a small wall with two column bases. They probably originally supported wooden columns to carry the roof. A large stone – worked on its base and tapered at the top – found in this room might be a mazzebe (cultic stone). This find and the special layout of the room point to it serving as a small gate sanctuary.

In the spring campaign of 2006, the first domestic structures were found inside the casemate wall. Unlike their Iron Age counterparts, these houses have sizable ground plans. The width of their walls suggests that they possessed a number of floors. To date, three courtyard houses and parts of another two very monumental elaborate buildings north and south of the area have been excavated. On the floor of the monumental building in the north of area I, in an area of one and a half meters by one and a half meters, twenty-three cylinder seals of varying quality and image type were found (in the surroundings five others). It would seem that the seals, together with a silver pendant decorated with a standing figure (5.8 x 3.4 centimeters), a large scarab amulet (3.7 x 2.4 x 1.4 centimeters) and dozens of beads, fell to the ground from a higher surface (a table, cupboard or shelf) during the destruction of the house and were left scattered over the floor. Overall 39 cylinder seals ere found in the Late Bronze Age context, mostly quartz and of the Mitanni stype.

The wealth of the city and its wide-reaching trade links are reflected in the manifold finds of this period (scarabs, terracotta figurines, outstanding bronze objects, a calcite vessel carved with figures of birds, imported faience wares from Egypt include vessels with papyrus images and rings with seals, imported pottery from Cyprus and Mycenaean Greece).

=== Iron Age ===
==== Iron Age I ====
The Iron Age I (12th–11th century BCE) settlement displays a very clear change of culture. There are no fortifications for this period. It is obvious that the inhabitants of the Early Iron Age did not create their own settlement pattern, but used the walls of their Late Bronze Age predecessors. The architecture is very distinctive. On the one hand, the inhabitants of the tall dug several large pits for grain storage, built small walls for stables with some installations and joined simple huts to older walls. On the other hand, an exceptionally large oven made of mud was found in the centre of the area. In addition, there is one larger building with carefully constructed walls, made of two or more rows of undressed stones. Its entrance was paved with stones. Larger areas have to be uncovered before the assumption can be confirmed that this building was either used for administrative purposes or as a residential building for a high-ranking person. And also in the north, a large four room house has been explored in 2008. Two charcoal samples give a radiocarbon dating for this stratum of 1220 to 970 BCE and 1270 to 1040 BCE with 95.4% probability.

==== Iron Age II - or: Biblical time ====
During the Iron Age, Tall Zira'a belonged to the so-called "villages of Jair" (Num 32,39–42; Dtn 3,13–15; Jos 13,29–31 [60 settlements]; Jdc 10,3–5 [30 settlements]; 1 kg 4,13; 1 Chr 2,21–23 [23 settlements]) like Ramoth in Gilead and Kamon. They are located in north Gilead, i.e., between the mountains of Ajlun and the Yarmuk River in Transjordan.

The architecture of the Iron Age IIA/B stratum (10th–8th century BCE) suggests that the tall's population increased in this period and that the settlement developed an urban character. Even though the fortifications are not as strong as those of the Late Bronze Age, the Iron Age II settlement was protected by a city wall. Various modifications to the houses were made so that two building phases (an early and a late one) can be distinguished. Until now, building remains of the Iron Age II settlement give the impression that the architecture was densely agglomerated. There are not only residential buildings but public buildings as well. The outer walls of the houses are connected to the zigzag-like settlement wall. There are several exposed areas that show that the Iron Age houses were separated from one another by a double wall so that the boundaries of buildings and property are clearly visible.
Three houses and a public area from the earlier phase of Iron Age II have been exposed. One of these houses had a workshop area consisting of four longitudinal rooms/courtyards. They yielded interesting finds: a metal furnace with a crucible still in situ in the south-eastern room, and a well-constructed fireplace and work surface in the north-eastern room. In the south-western room a tabun (oven) was discovered, and the north-western part contained some clay loom weights and four more ovens. It is possible that they were used simultaneously. Close to a paved courtyard and another room with three, high column bases made of field stones a large storage vessel and a cultic stone (mazzebe) were found in situ. A radiocarbon sample gave a dating between 1270 and 980 BCE with 95.4% probability.

The building layout of the later phase of Iron Age II is characterised by an obvious rearrangement of the houses, though not the city wall. In the public area the depot for oil pithoi of the older phase had apparently been closed and the large storage pits changed into a paved courtyard with a massive working stone. A radiocarbon sample from this layer gave a dating between 1120 and 900 BCE with 95.4% probability.

In the northern and the southern squares, the architecture is densely agglomerated. At least four houses have been identified so far. One of them can be identified as a workshop. It was furnished with a bench along the wall and a large cylindrical, very carefully cut limestone workbench (60 cm in diameter). Very close to this stone, a semi-circular stone basin, two ‘industry pots’, a spindle whorl, and an egg-shaped tool of clay were found on the ashy floor.

=== Late Hellenistic-Early Roman period ===
During the Hellenistic-Early Roman period (4th century BCE–1st century CE) Area I was used but not inhabited. It was predominantly utilized for waste disposal facilities. Three large pits had also been dug and carefully lined out with stones for the storage of grain.

=== Roman-Byzantine period ===
The Roman-Byzantine period (2nd–7th century CE) is the uppermost stratum in Area I. Five houses of the Roman-Byzantine period can be distinguished, some of them with elaborate room arrangements. A stone-paved street following the contour line of the slope divided the buildings into a western and an eastern section. A thick wall of dressed stones constructed with stretchers and headers, which is visible halfway down the slope to the east of the tall, suggests that the settlement was fortified. In fact, it is possible that the fortification of such a densely inhabited settlement was necessary in the 3rd/4th century when the political situation in Palestine became unstable. Two coins from this stratum have been dated, one to the time of Hadrian (117–138 CE), the second to between 400 and 450 CE.

=== Islamic period ===
The 2001 survey of the tall showed that the settlement on the tall plateau during the Islamic period did not extend across the entire area. Habitation in this period is concentrated in specific places. These will be explored in future years, i.e., the area around the spring (Late Islamic period) and another area on the south-eastern plateau (Middle Islamic period).

== The excavation of the artesian spring from 2025 to 2026 ==
From 14 October to 22 November 2025 and from 26 March to 17 April 2026, the DEI team, led by Dieter Vieweger and Katja Soennecken, carried out two excavation campaigns at Tall Zirāʿa, including the processing of finds. The aim of the archaeological investigation was to study the artesian spring. This spring initially formed the travertine hill itself and later, over thousands of years, provided ideal conditions for settlement, as it ensured the settlement’s water supply throughout the year. The flow of water could still be observed at the start of the DEI/BAI excavations. However, this was halted in 2004/2005 by drilling carried out by hydraulic engineers. Water remained in the spring pond for a few more years, but it has now been dry since 2011. Following geophysical preparatory work (drilling by Kiel University; Stefan Dreibrodt) carried out at the spring in 2021, excavations began there on 19 October (Area IV). With a team of 15 staff members and an equal number of Jordanian workers, the area was first cleared and then excavated within the various squares to establish a stratigraphy. Furthermore, the aim was to investigate the development of the spring area through the various settlement periods of the valley (from the Early Bronze Age to modern times) and to determine the depth of the spring pool. In addition, archaeobotanical methods were used to study the climate and vegetation over the centuries, whilst archaeological methods were employed to investigate the settlement patterns around the spring. Our investigations showed that as early as prehistoric times (Natufian and Neolithic periods), people gathered on the travertine plateau of the Zirāʿa Valley, presumably around numerous natural spring openings in the travertine, and lived near the hill either temporarily or permanently. The floor of the spring basin was situated at an elevation of -33.60 m below sea level (BSL), whilst the surface of Area IV lies at -23.24 m BSL. Unusually, the two most significant settlement phases – the Bronze and Iron Ages – were absent from both the excavated spring basin and the boreholes. No stone walls were discovered to line the spring walls and demarcate the settlement from the water basin, as is the case, for example, in Byblos. The dry-stone wall constructions typical of the Bronze and Iron Ages could not be identified anywhere in the excavated area.

The three drill cores taken in 2022 had already shown that the sediments from the spring contained only prehistoric deposits and ‘more recent’ material dating from the Early Roman period to modern times. Here, too, no finds from the Bronze or Iron Ages were identified. The excavations revealed that the spring area was a large, oval-shaped natural depression which had been worked and used for water extraction throughout all periods since the Early Roman period. At times, the spring pond was divided into two basins, with the spring opening located in the eastern basin. The western basin was supplied with water via a ceramic pipe. After the pond eventually silted up and became polluted, a well-like shaft was added during the Ottoman period, through which water could be drawn from the depths of the pond to the surface. The dating of these spring installations has been confirmed by radiocarbon samples. Together with Stefan Dreibrodt (Kiel University), an archaeological, scientific and pedological analysis of the overall findings will be presented following the campaign in spring 2026.

These surprising results raise several questions: Why was the drawing area of an artesian spring, which consistently provided abundant drinking water, relocated in the 1st century BC? And why to this particular spot? Why was the old water extraction system not continued, given that water conduits have been consistently identified on the tell throughout the Bronze and Iron Ages – meaning a functioning water management system existed?

In future geophysical investigations on the tell, the primary focus will be on determining where the spring area from the Bronze and Iron Ages was located. So far, only vague indications are known.

== Final excavation publication ==
The excavations were initially brought to a provisional close in autumn 2011, following 18 campaigns, to allow for a comprehensive publication of the findings to date. Separately, the surrounding area survey was carried out and completed in 2014. Since then, the excavation team has published its findings, many initially in the form of doctoral theses. The first volume of the final publication was published in print and online in 2017. By 2025, 10 volumes had been published in English, all of which are available in book form from Gütersloher Verlag – as well as free of charge as PDFs via the aforementioned website. The final volume on the artesian spring and the remaining Strata 1 and 2 will be published in the same manner in 2027. This marks the initial conclusion of the research at Tall Zirā'a. The tell will undoubtedly remain a rewarding and rich research destination for future generations.

== See also ==
- Cities of the Ancient Near East
