= Biblical Archaeological Institute =

Research institute of the University of Wuppertal

Coordinates: 51.240°N 7.164°E

Biblical Archaeological Institute Wuppertal
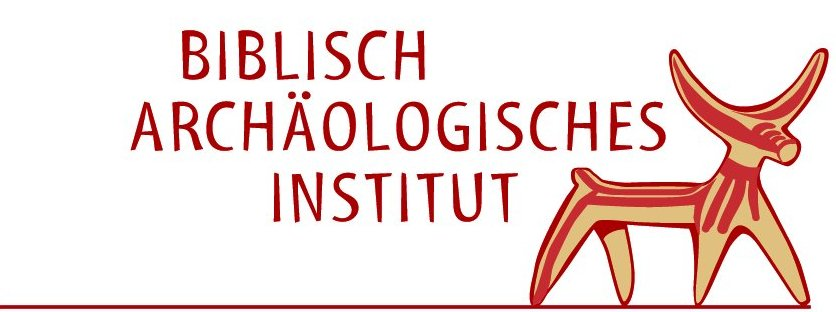
- Established: 1999
- Director: Dieter Vieweger
- Faculty: Archeology, Biblical Archeology
- Endowment: Friends of the BAI (e.V.)
- Address: Bergische Universität Wuppertal; Campus Freudenberg, Haus FD/III; Rainer-Gruenter-Strasse 21; DE 42097 Wuppertal
- Location: University of Wuppertal; Protestant University of Wuppertal, Wuppertal, Germany
- Website: www.bai-wuppertal.de

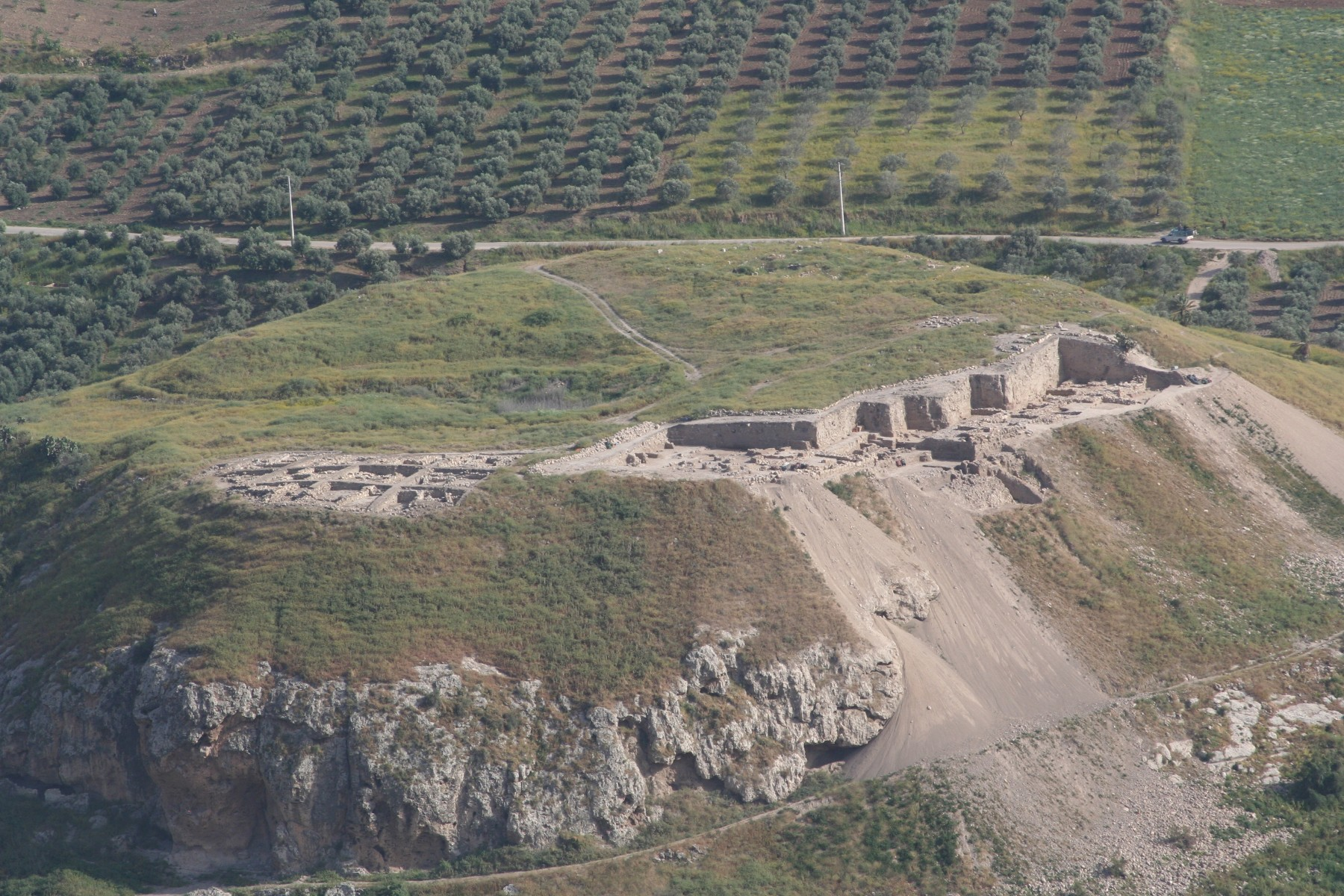
Tall Zira'a in spring 2010

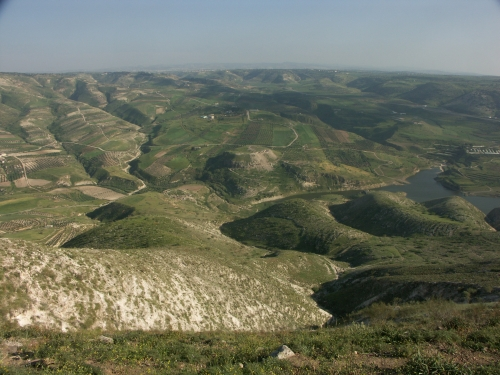
Wadi al-‘Arab and Tall Zira'a 2007

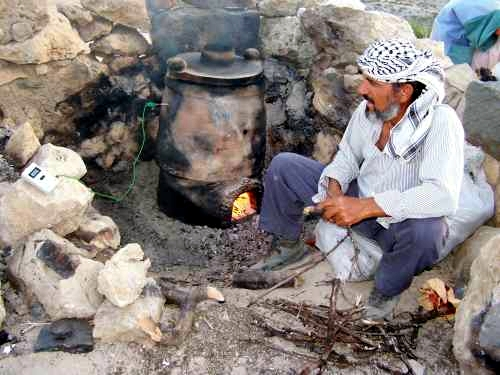
Experimental Archaeology Tall Zira'a 2006

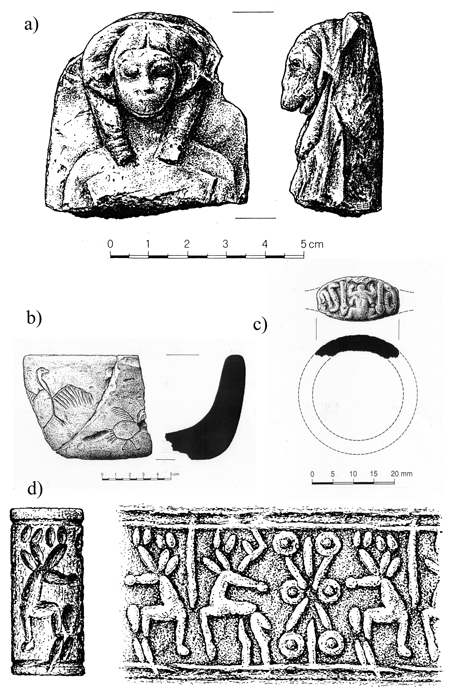
Tall Zira'a Finds 2007

The Biblical Archaeological Institute Wuppertal (BAI) was established in 1999 by the Protestant Church of the Rhineland. It constitutes an institute of the “Protestant University of Wuppertal” as well as an associated institute of the University of Wuppertal and holds the right to award doctorates at both universities.

The necessary financial endowment is provided by the “Friends of the BAI” (e.V.).

== Scientific aims ==
Since 1999 four main objectives of research are being pursued. These comprehend:

- Excavation projects (especially in the Eastern Mediterranean)
- The application of modern methods in Archaeology - i.e. Geophysics (geoelectrics and tomography; geomagnetics; georadar) and terrestrial research (Photogrammetry)
- Archaeometry (chemical and mineralogical pottery analysis; experimental firing of pottery); the main interest is to write a history of pottery production in the investigation area; since 2008 also research work on ancient glass and faience industry
- Experimental archaeology (Production of pottery replicas in historically correct manufacturing methods)

== Main archaeological projects ==
=== Different projects ===
The Biblical Archaeological Institute has conducted excavations and geophysical research in Italy, Greece, Israel and the Hashemite Kingdom of Jordan.

- Villa Hadriana (Italy) 2002–2004
- Geophysical prospection in Olympia (Greece) 2001
- Esch-Schallaf (Jordan) 1998–1999
- Ba'ja I, close to Petra (Jordan) 1999
- Sal (Jordan) 1999–2000

=== The Gadara Region Project and the Tall Zira'a ===
Since 2001 the institute's research focuses on the exploration of the Gadara region. The largest site in the area is the Tall Zira'a which comprises over 5000 years of settlement history. At this place in 2001 a survey was conducted. In 2003 started the first excavation of a long term project which is scheduled until 2020. Since 2004 the German Protestant Institute of Archaeology Amman is a partner of the project. Since 2006 the corresponding institute in Jerusalem participates likewise. The currently running excavation seasons are accomplished by a regional survey covering the greater Wadi al-'Arab area since 2009.

On the Tall Zira'a settlements from over more than five millennia are being excavated. Furthermore, the agricultural potential as well as flora and fauna, geology, hydrology, trade relations (roads, infrastructure) and the strategic importance of the Wadi al-Arab are being explored.

About 25 km^{2} of the greater Wadi al-'Arab area (south of the ancient city of Gadara) were under research since 2009. In the area are more than 100 sites which date from prehistory to the Islamic period.

With the help of archaeometrical methods the artefacts from the Tall Zira'a are being examined concerning their respective materials. Thereby, the research concentrates on pottery, glass and faience to gain insight into the possible location of production sites and the technological knowledge.

The research described above goes hand in hand with experimental archaeology, applying old techniques e. g. of constructing a potters oven and firing the products.

The geophysical prospection of the Tall Zira'a used geoelectrical mapping, two-dimensional tomography and three-dimensional tomographical techniques to

- plan archaeological excavations in advance as exact as possible and devise appropriate methods of excavation,
- acquire knowledge concerning unexcavated areas and
- protect areas for future excavations.

== Director ==
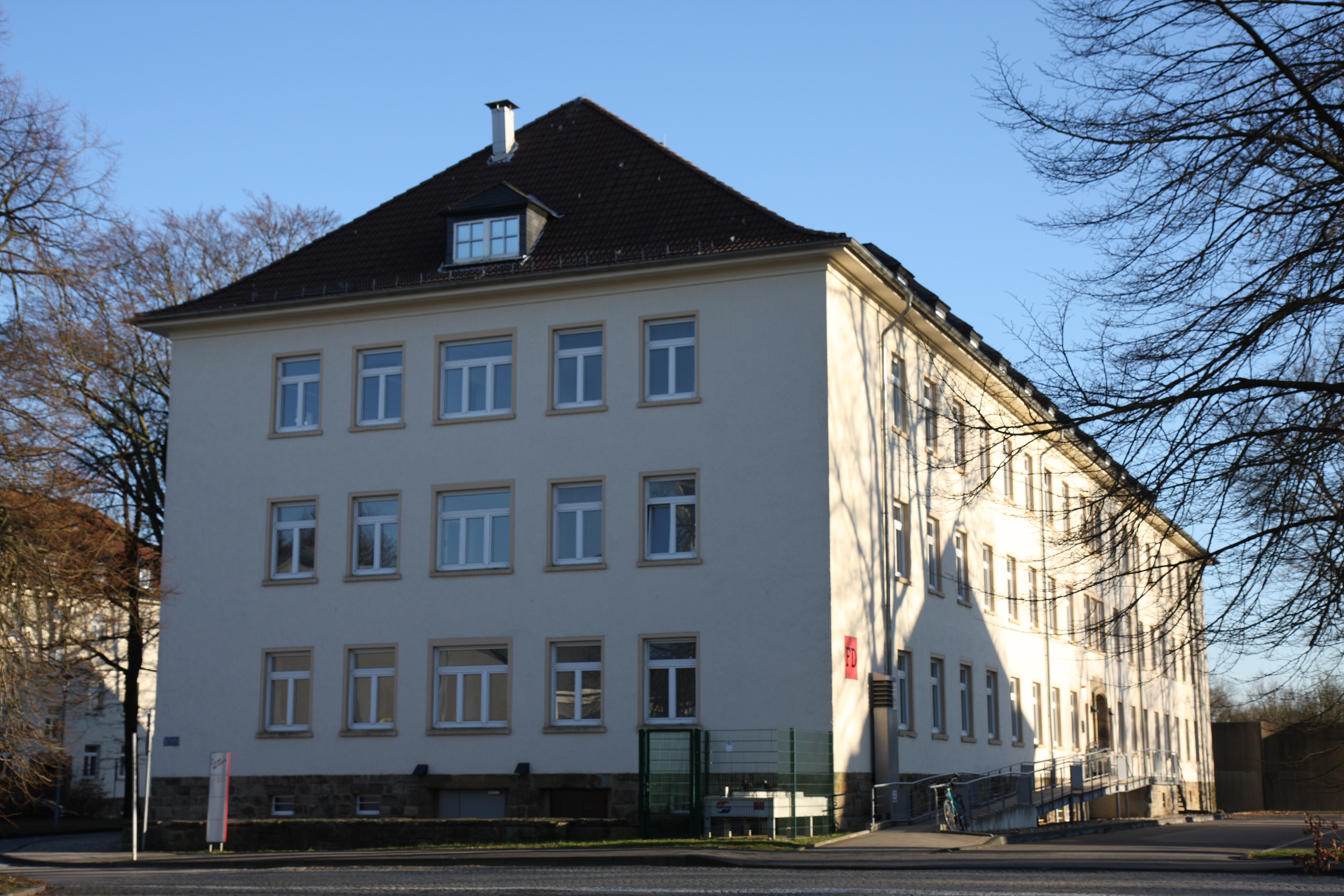
BAI at Wuppertal University 2008

The first Director of the Biblical Archaeological Institute is Dieter Vieweger who was appointed in 1999. Since November 2005 he is also the Director of the German Protestant Institute of Archaeology in Jerusalem and Amman. He is professor at the Protestant University of Wuppertal as well as at the Witten/Herdecke University.

== Location University of Wuppertal (Bergische Universität Wuppertal) ==
On 13 July 2003 the move-in of the BAI in the facilities of the Bergische Universität, Campus Freudenberg was ceremonially solemnized. The stuff of the BAI is mainly concerned with the archaeological research of the finds from the Tall Zira´a.

The BAI on the Campus Freudenberg of the Bergische Universität Wuppertal can easily be reached by car via A 1, A 46 and L 418. Public transport is being provided from Wuppertal central station by Bus "E". The institute is located on the 3rd floor of building FD.
