= Dieter Vieweger =

German archaeologist

Dieter Vieweger (born 8 May 1958) is a German archaeologist (prehistory and early history) and Evangelical Lutheran theologian (Old Testament scholar) who has taught at universities in Wuppertal, Münster, Witten-Herdecke and Jerusalem. He is the director of research institutes in Jerusalem and Amman, as well as in Wuppertal.

== Vita ==
=== Education ===
Dieter Vieweger was expelled from school (EOS Theodor Neubauer, Karl-Marx-Stadt) in 1974 for political reasons. He then attended a non-state-recognised educational institution of the Protestant Church in Saxony (Proseminar Moritzburg) where he passed his Reifeprüfung in 1976. Since he was not entitled to attend a university, he studied at the Theological Seminary from 1976 to 1981.

After the first theological examination in 1981, he completed the Vicariate (Protestant) and the catechetical training at the Saxon Regional Church from 1981 to 1982. From 1982 to 1986 he worked as a research assistant at the Theological Seminary Leipzig. In 1986 he was awarded a doctorate based on his thesis The Specificity of the Vocation Narratives of Jeremiah and Ezekiel in the Context of Similar Units of the Old Testament PhD which was supervised by Siegfried Wagner and Wolfram Herrmann from the Karl Marx University Leipzig.

=== Rectory and theological teaching ===
From 1986 to 1989 Dieter Vieweger was the pastor of the Thomanerchor Leipzig. In 1987 he was ordained at St Thomas' Church in Leipzig. In 1989 he habilitated at the Karl Marx University in Leipzig with the thesis The Literary Relations between the Books of Jeremiah and Ezekiel. From 1989 to 1991 he was professor of Old Testament Studies at the Kirchliche Hochschule Berlin (Sprachenkonvikt) and from 1991 to 1993 professor at the Humboldt-Universität zu Berlin. Since 1993 he is holding the professorship for Old Testament at the "Kirchliche Hochschule Wuppertal". He also was appointed rector there in 1997/1998 and 2005/2006.

=== Archaeological training and academic career ===
In addition to teaching in Wuppertal, he studied Prehistory at the Johann Wolfgang Goethe University Frankfurt am Main from 1994 to 1998, which he completed with a doctorate titled "On the Chronology of the Necropolis of Tamassos-Lambertis" under Jens Lüning. His first archaeological excavation experiences included the 1994/1995 campaigns on Tell el-Oreme at the north-western end of the Lake Genezareth with Volkmar Fritz in Israel and with Peter M. Fischer in Tell Abu al-Kharaz in the northern Jordan Rift Valley in Jordan.

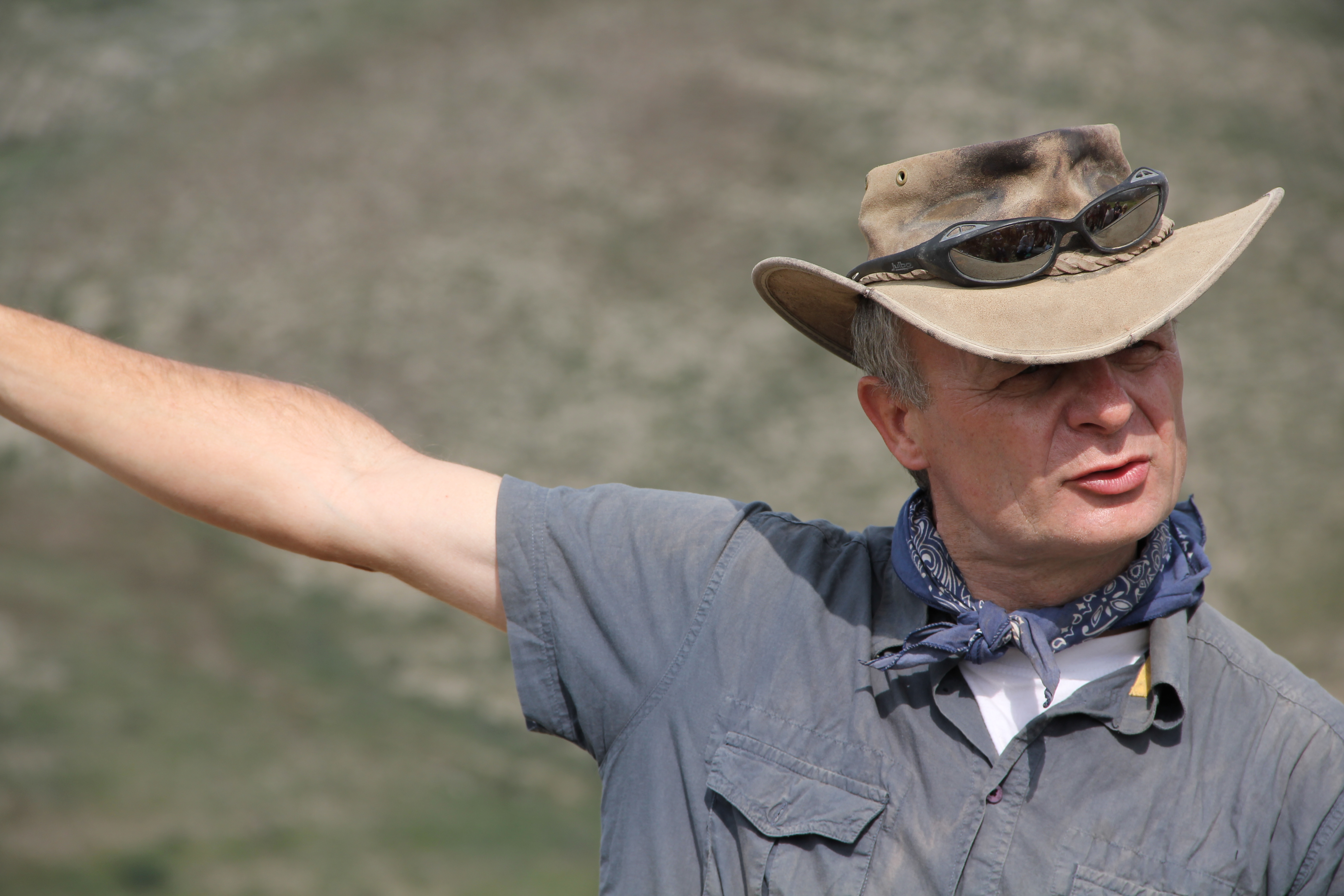
Dieter Vieweger, 2010

Since 1991 he has been a tutor for the Studienstiftung des deutschen Volkes, first at the Humboldt University in Berlin, then at the Bergische Universität Wuppertal. He regularly conducts seminars at summer academies of the Studienstiftung.

From 1999 to 2024, Vieweger has taught at the University of Witten-Herdecke and was awarded the research professorship Archaeology and Ancient History there in 2002, which was converted into a visiting professorship in 2009.

On 4 July 2024, Dieter Vieweger delivered his farewell lecture, “Behind the Scenes of Jerusalem,” at the Kirchliche Hochschule Wuppertal. He preached on Ecclesiastes 3 (“To everything there is a season…”) during the closing service marking the end of the 2024 summer term.

=== Private life ===
Dieter Vieweger is married and has a son. He lives in Jerusalem and Wuppertal.

== Memberships of professional societies ==
- From 1992 to 2005, member of the Administrative Board and later also of the Scientific Advisory Board of the German Protestant Institute for Archaeology, Jerusalem and Amman, before becoming its Director in December 2005.
- Since 2006 Senior Fellow of the Albright Institute, Jerusalem.
- Member of the scientific advisory board for the publication of the Zeitschrift für Orientarchäologie (previously Baghdader Mitteilungen and Damaszener Mitteilungen) at the German Archaeological Institute Berlin, Orient Department.
- 2012-2016 advisory board member at the "Bibelhaus Erlebnismuseum", Frankfurt/Main.
- 2015-2017 Member of the scientific advisory board of the "Bibelmuseum Nürnberg".
- From 1994 to 2008 co-editor of the Zeitschrift des Deutschen Palästina-Vereins (ZDPV) and the Abhandlungen des Deutschen Palästina-Vereins (ADPV) as well as member of the board of the German Palestine Association.

== Director of archaeological institutes ==
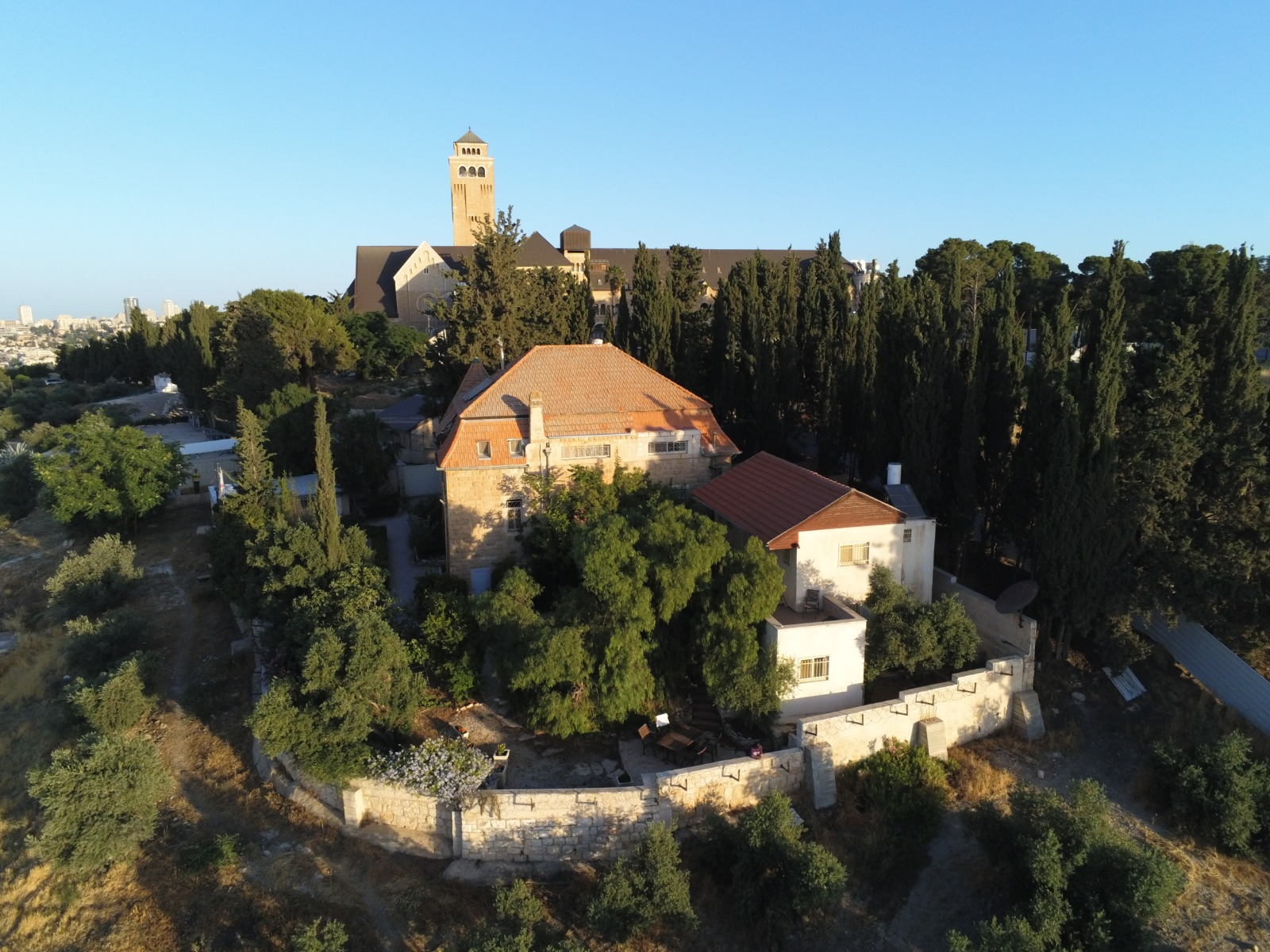
The German Protestant Institute for Archaeology on the Mount of Olives in Jerusalem

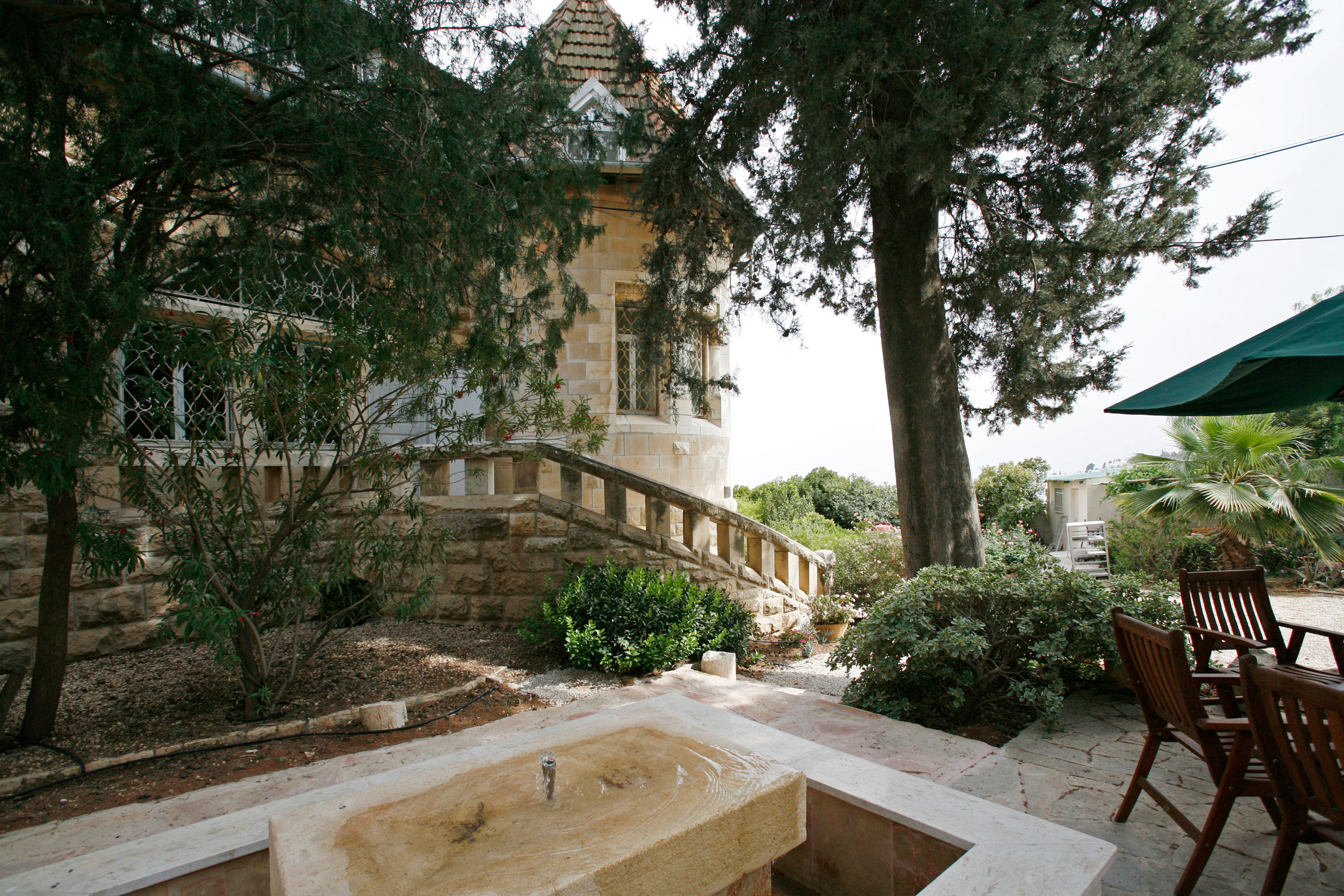
The historic building of the German Protestant Institute for Archaeology on the Mount of Olives in Jerusalem

Since 2005 Dieter Vieweger has been the director of the German Protestant Institute for Archaeology in the Holy Land in Jerusalem and Amman (GPIA), with which he has been closely associated since 1992. In March 2007, a close cooperation between the German Archaeological Institute and the DEI was initiated with a ceremony at the Federal Foreign Office in Berlin. Following that the DEI then also became a Research Centre of the German Archaeological Institute. The GPIA works closely and trustfully with the Israeli, Palestinian and Jordanian archaeological authorities. It maintains simultaneous excavations in Jordan, in Israel and in the A-region of Palestine. Under Vieweger's directorship, the institute was officially recognised as a scientific institution by state authorities in both Israel and Jordan and accorded as status equivalent to that of national academic faculties.

Dieter Vieweger has been the director of the Biblical Archaeological Institute (BAI) since 1999. The BAI Wuppertal promotes in particular geophysical prospection in archaeology, terrestrial photogrammetry, archaeometry (focus: research into the history of technology in ancient crafts) and experimental archaeology. The institute's first long-term archaeological research project ('Gadara Region Project') began in 2001.

== Head of archaeological projects in the Middle East ==
=== Gadara Region Project (2001 - 2026) ===
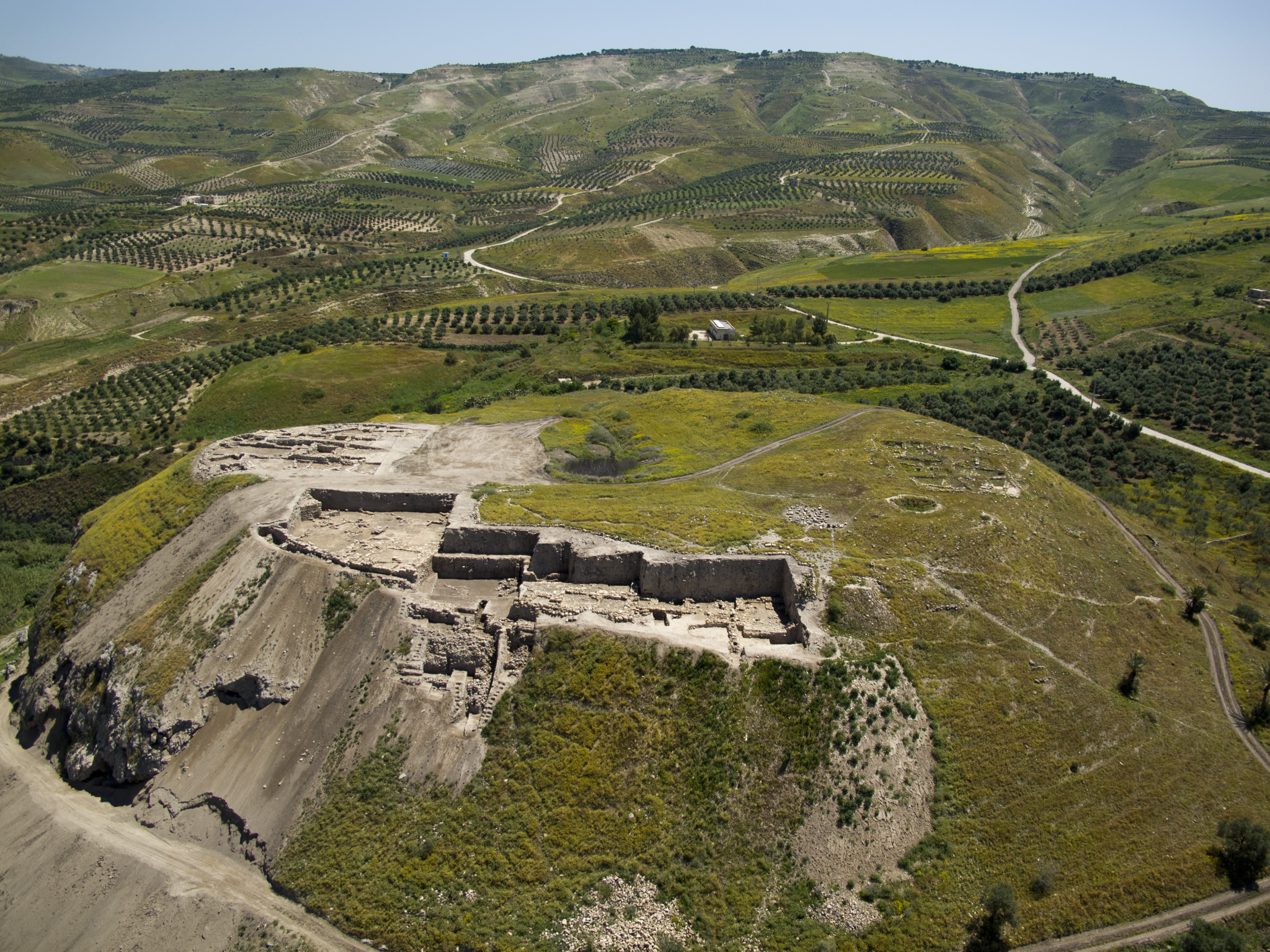
Tall Zira'a im Jahr 2011

The archaeological research project (Gadara Region Project) began in 2001 and includes the exploration of the Wadi el-Arab as well as the excavation on the settlement mound Tall Zira'a in the tri-border area Jordan, Syria, Israel, which has been continuously inhabited for over 5000 years. The aim of the project is to explore the diverse cultures from many millennia of human history in this geopolitically prominent landscape – the Wadi al-'Arab region. The central site in the Wadi al-'Arab is Tall Zira'a. The site is about 200 m in diameter. Its highest point is 17 m below sea level. Here, the history of Palestine from the Chalcolithic, Bronze and Iron Ages to the Classical and early medieval periods can be explored in an exemplary way. Well over 30 strata provide information about permanent human settlements in this area. The tell was situated in the vicinity of an important trade route between Egypt and Mesopotamia, which led via Megiddo and Damascus. Tall Zira'a is the predecessor settlement of the Hellenistic-Roman site of Gadara. It later also gave the survivors of Gadara's destruction by violent earthquakes between 747 and 749 AD a new settlement opportunity. The DEI Amman has been involved in the research since 2004 and the DEI Jerusalem since 2006. Since 2016, the DEI Amman has been leading the project.

The archaeological exploration of the Wadi al-'Arab region around Tall Zira'a, which covers about 25 square kilometres, was led and published by Katja Soennecken and Patrick Leiverkus (both DEI). The wadi formed a cultural bridge between the Mediterranean area and Transjordan in the past.

In 2019, a special exhibition at the National Museum of Jordan in Amman paid tribute to the great importance of the settlement mound for the Jordanian Kingdom under the title 'Tall Zira'a - Mirror of Jordan's History'. The exhibition was shown in Irbid in 2020. Its dispatch to Germany failed due to the outbreak of Corona.

=== Excavations and archaeological park under the Church of the Redeemer in Jerusalem (2009–2012) ===
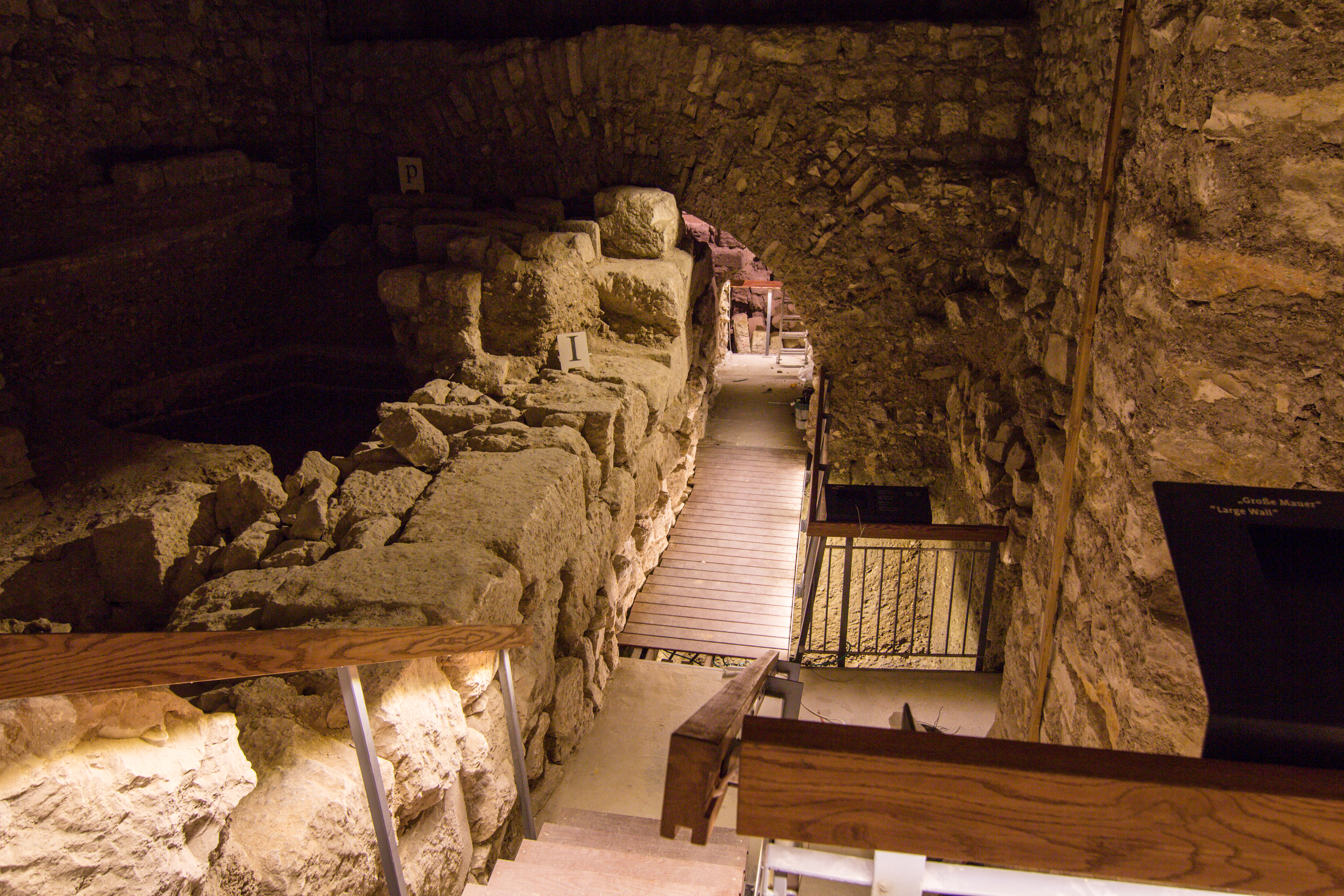
Archaeological Park below the Redeemer Church of Jerusalem

Dieter Vieweger initiated and led the restoration and research project "Tourist development of the old excavation under the Erlöserkirche" in the Old City of Jerusalem. In the process, the archaeological park "Through the Ages" was created. Here, right next to the Church of the Holy Sepulchre, pilgrims and tourists can look up to 14 m below the floor of the Church of the Redeemer. Via stairs and bridges it is possible to see parts of the Herodian quarry, the gardens/fields of the city destroyed in 70 AD. by Titus, the Hadrianic expansion of Jerusalem (132-135 AD), Constantine's construction work on the forum south of the Church of the Holy Sepulchre (325-335 AD) as well as the Crusader church of St. Latina (12th century AD)

=== Excavations on Mount Zion in Jerusalem (2015–2026) ===
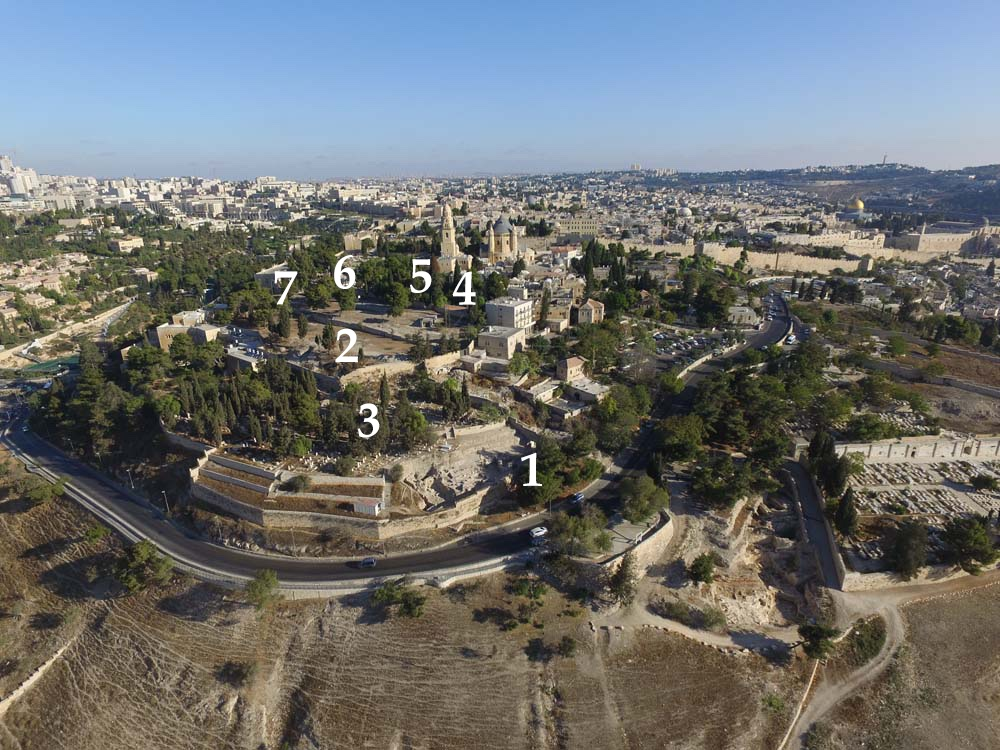
Mt. Zion – German excavation areas from South

Since 2015, Dieter Vieweger has been leading the excavations on Mount Zion in Jerusalem. First, the Jerusalem city wall with three superimposed city gates (including the 'Essene Gate' mentioned by Flavius Josephus) was explored in the Anglican-Prussian cemetery followed by the adjacent urban strata dating to the Hellenistic until the Islamic (Umayyad) period (Area I). Afterwards, a rich late antique villa was uncovered in the 'Greek Garden' (Area II). In addition, the medieval (Ayyubid) fortification of Mount Zion was investigated and several early Roman houses were explored (Area III). In 2021, in the garden of the Abbey of the Dormition (Area IV), the DEI found, among other things, parts of an tall fortification wall surrounding the medieval church and the associated monastery on Mount Zion, which were once the last bastion to be taken by Saladin during the conquest of Jerusalem. This findings were further explored in the 2022 season in the upper Dormitio Garden (Area V). In the years 2023 to 2026, further excavations were undertaken in the 'Greek Garden' (Area VI) and in the Greek-Orthodox Cemetery (Area VII).

=== Cultural Property Protection in Jordan (2018–2023) ===
From 2018 until 2023 Dieter Vieweger and Jutta Häser have been conducting the project "Cultural Property Protection in Jordan. Digital recording and documentation of finds in the archaeological museum in Amman" (DOJAM). The project digitally records all finds in the exhibitions and archives of the Citadel Museum and the National Museum Amman - as well as all other archaeological museums in Jordan in the future - in a newly created central English-Arabic-language database, which serves in particular to protect cultural property. DOJAM has been adopted by the relevant authorities in 2022 as a national project of the Hashemite Kingdom of Jordan.

=== Archaeological explorations in Bethlehem (from 2021) ===
At Bethlehem University, an archaeological course of study has been established together with the DAAD.

=== Further excavation projects in the Orient ===
Dieter Vieweger is/was head of various archaeological research projects in Jordan, Israel and Italy. This work was largely commissioned by the Biblical Archaeological Institute Wuppertal, including:

- Esch-Schallaf (Jordan) 1998-1999 co-director.
- Ba'ja I near Petra (Jordan) 1999 Director
- Sal (Jordan) 1999-2000 Co-director
- Geophysical exploration of the Christian quarter of the Old City of Jerusalem 2014–2019.

== "History of the Biblical World" (5 volumes) ==
Dieter Vieweger describes in the first three volumes of his work History of the Biblical World the history of the southern Levant from the beginnings of human settlement to the emergence of Rabbinic-Pharisaic Judaism and the early church in the 3rd century AD.

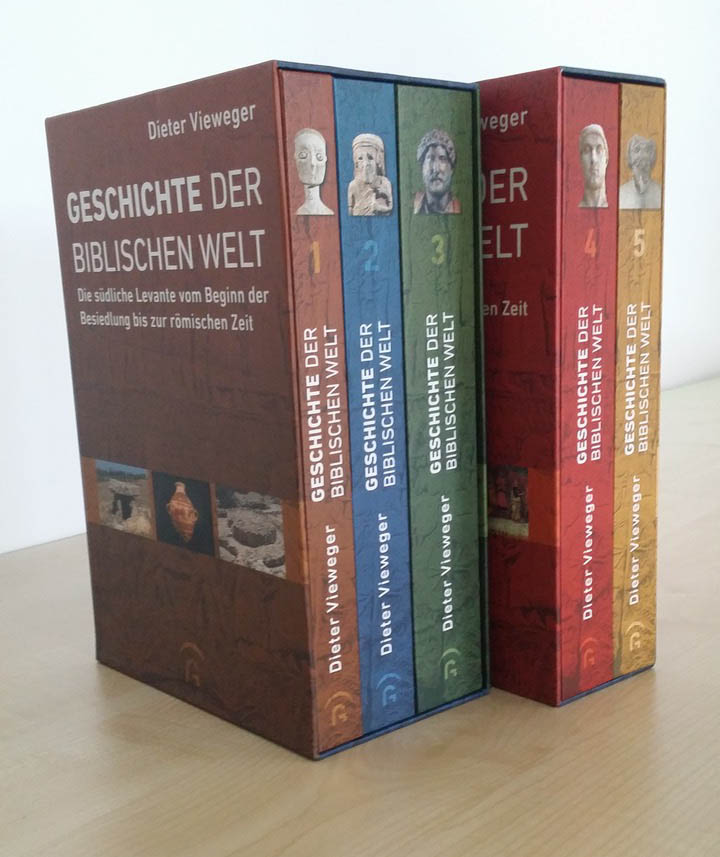
Dieter Vieweger, History of the biblical world, volumes I-V

It presents the social and economic as well as the political and religious-historical dynamics of the region in which the Bible - as we know it today - has its origin: Not theological interests guide the presentation, but the research in the fields of archaeology, ancient history, epigraphy and iconography. Their contributions help to understand these epochs, as well the interpretations of the biblical writers.

In 2022, the two following volumes on Late Antiquity (3rd-7th century; Volume IV) and on the Umayyads (7th-8th century; Volume V) were published.

The work relates the central historical events to the developments of the Christian, Jewish, Samaritan and Muslim communities. It shows how their religious writings related to their environment, interpretation and struggle. In the process, it becomes clear how power politics and rival religious convictions permanently shaped a region that is still one of the most politically tense in the world today.

== School projects in the Middle East ==
Dieter Vieweger is the initiator of the award-winning peace project "My City – My History", which is carried out annually in cooperation between the DEI Jerusalem and the Schmidt's Girls School, Jerusalem. The youth book "Adventure Jerusalem" serves as the textbook for this project.

Dieter Vieweger has been conducting a comparable project ("My homeland – My History") in cooperation between the DEI Jerusalem and the German school abroad Talitha Kumi, Bethlehem, since 2021. Together with the 10th grade students, he visits famous pagan, Jewish, Christian and Muslim sites in Jericho, Bethlehem and Hebron. It becomes clear that a variety of historical influences shape today's life in the students' home country.

== Commissioned by the Evangelical Church in Germany ==
Vieweger is deputy to the provost of the "Evangelical Church of the German Language in Jerusalem" and coordinates the educational work on behalf of the Evangelical Church in Germany (EKD) in Israel. During the change between two ministers, he took over the office of provost in Jerusalem for a few months in 2012.

== Honors ==
In January 2018 Dieter Vieweger received the Federal Cross of Merit 1st Class for his services to the German Protestant Institute for Archaeology, Jerusalem and Amman, as well as the Biblical Archaeological Institute (BAI) at the Kirchliche Hochschule Wuppertal.

The Department of "Geistes- und Kulturwissenschaften" of the Bergische Universität Wuppertal awarded Dieter Vieweger an honorary doctorate in July 2009.

In 2007 Dieter Vieweger became a corresponding member of the German Archaeological Institute. Since 2009 he has been a full member of the German Archaeological Institute.

== Literature (selection) ==
- Die Spezifik der Berufungsberichte Jeremias und Ezechiels im Umfeld ähnlicher Einheiten des Alten Testaments (= Beiträge zur Erforschung des Alten Testaments und des Antiken Judentums. Band 6). Lang, Frankfurt am Main/Bern/New York 1986, ISBN 3-8204-8948-7 (Dissertation, Leipzig 1985).
- Die literarischen Beziehungen zwischen den Büchern Jeremia und Ezechiel (= Beiträge zur Erforschung des Alten Testaments und des Antiken Judentums. Band 26). Lang, Frankfurt am Main/Bern/New York 1993, ISBN 3-631-40725-4.
- Zur Chronologie der Nekropole von Tamassos-Lambertis, Zypern. Dissertation, Johann Wolfgang Goethe Universität Frankfurt am Main 1998.
- mit Siegfried Kreuzer u. a.: Proseminar Altes Testament. Ein Arbeitsbuch. Kohlhammer, Stuttgart 1999, ISBN 3-17-013050-1 (3th revised and expanded edition 2019, ISBN 978-3-17-019063-4).
- Archäologie der biblischen Welt. Vandenhoeck und Ruprecht, Göttingen 2003, ISBN 3-525-03242-0 (new edition, Gütersloher Verlagshaus, Gütersloh 2012, ISBN 978-3-579-08131-1).
- mit Friederike Rave und Claudia Voigt: Das Geheimnis des Tells. Eine archäologische Reise in den Orient (Archäologie für Kinder von 10–12 Jahren). Zabern, Mainz 2005, ISBN 3-8053-3519-9 (2th edition, Arachne-Verlag, Gelsenkirchen 2011, ISBN 978-3-932005-43-5).
- Streit um das Heilige Land. Was jeder vom israelisch-palästinensischen Konflikt wissen sollte. Gütersloher Verlagshaus, Gütersloh 2010, ISBN 978-3-579-01374-9 (9th edition 2025).
- mit Ina Beyer und Hans D. Beyer: Abenteuer Jerusalem. Die aufregende Geschichte einer Stadt dreier Weltreligionen. Gütersloher Verlagshaus, Gütersloh 2011, ISBN 978-3-579-06736-0 (4th edition 2019).
- mit Gabriele Förder-Hoff: Der archäologische Park unter der Erlöserkirche von Jerusalem. Wichern, Berlin 2012, ISBN 978-3-88981-351-0.
- mit Christian Vogg: Wie man ein Königsgrab findet. Archäologie für Einsteiger. Herder, Freiburg 2013, ISBN 978-3-451-30308-1.
- mit Jutta Häser: Der Tall Zirā’a. Fünf Jahrtausende Geschichte in einem Siedlungshügel. Wichern, Berlin 2013, ISBN 978-3-88981-362-6.
- mit Shimon Gibson (Hrsg.): The archaeology and history of the Church of the Redeemer and the Muristan in Jerusalem. A collection of essays from a workshop on the Church of the Redeemer and its vicinity held on 8th/9th September 2014 in Jerusalem. Archaeopress, Oxford 2016, ISBN 978-1-78491-419-6 (english).
- mit Jutta Häser (Hrsg.): Tall Zirāʿa. The Gadara Region Project (2001–2011). 10 Volumes, Gütersloher Verlagshaus. Gütersloh 2017 ff. (english).
- Geschichte der biblischen Welt.
  - I. Paläolithikum bis Bronzezeit, II. Eisenzeit, III. Persische bis römische Zeit. 3 Volumes, Gütersloher Verlagshaus, Gütersloh 2019, ISBN 978-3-579-01479-1.
  - IV. Spätantike, V. Umayyadische Zeit. 2 Volumes, Gütersloher Verlagshaus, Gütersloh 2022, ISBN 978-3-579-07177-0.
