= Camon (surname) =

Camon is a surname. Notable people with the surname include:

- Alessandro Camon (born 1963), Italian-American screenwriter and film producer
- Ferdinando Camon (born 1935), Italian writer
- Núria Camón (born 1978), Spanish field hockey player

== See also ==
- Kamon (name)
