= German Protestant Institute of Archaeology =

Biblical archaeological institute

Coordinates: 31°47′10.3″N 35°15′02″E

Logo GPIA

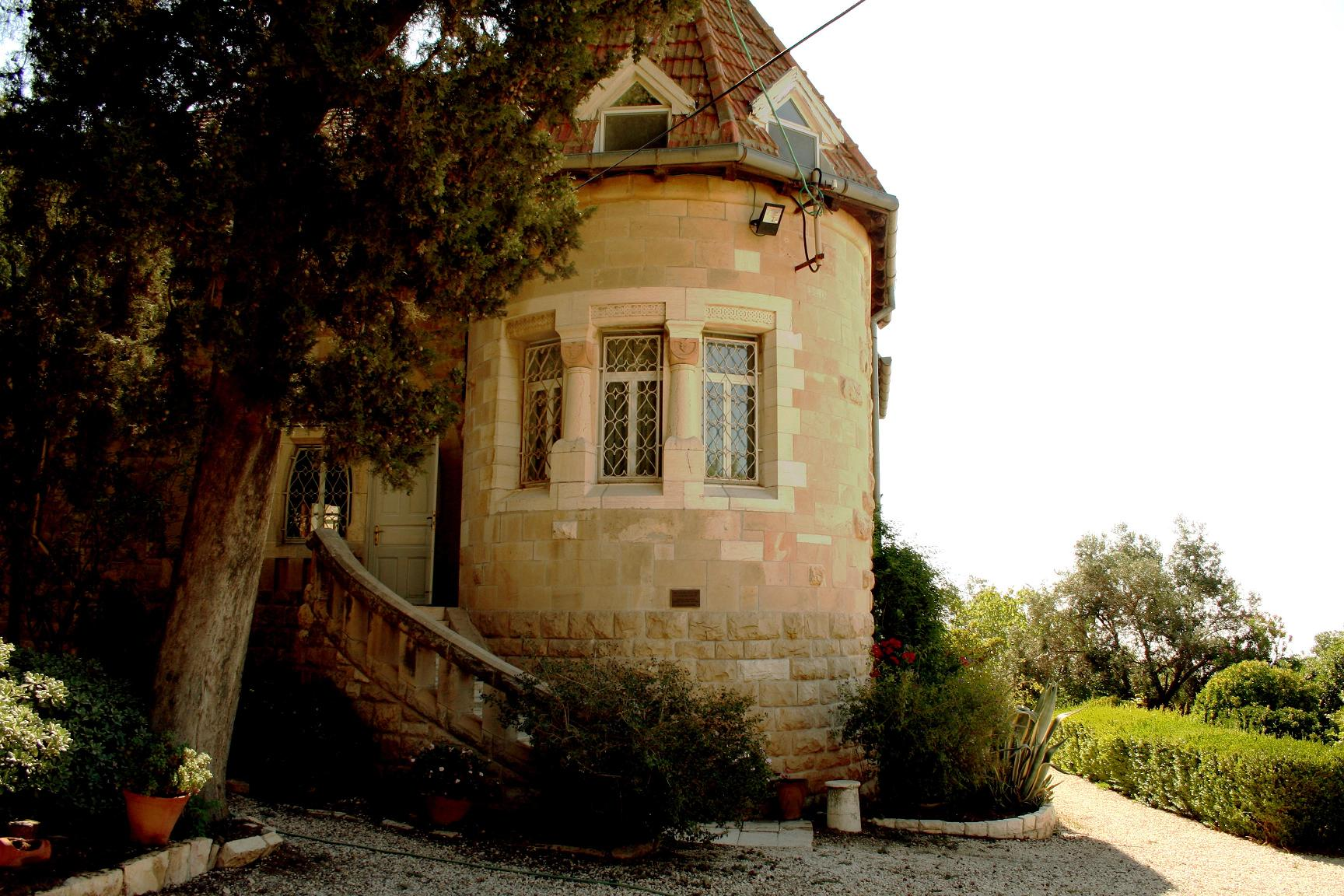
The institute in Jerusalem in 2007

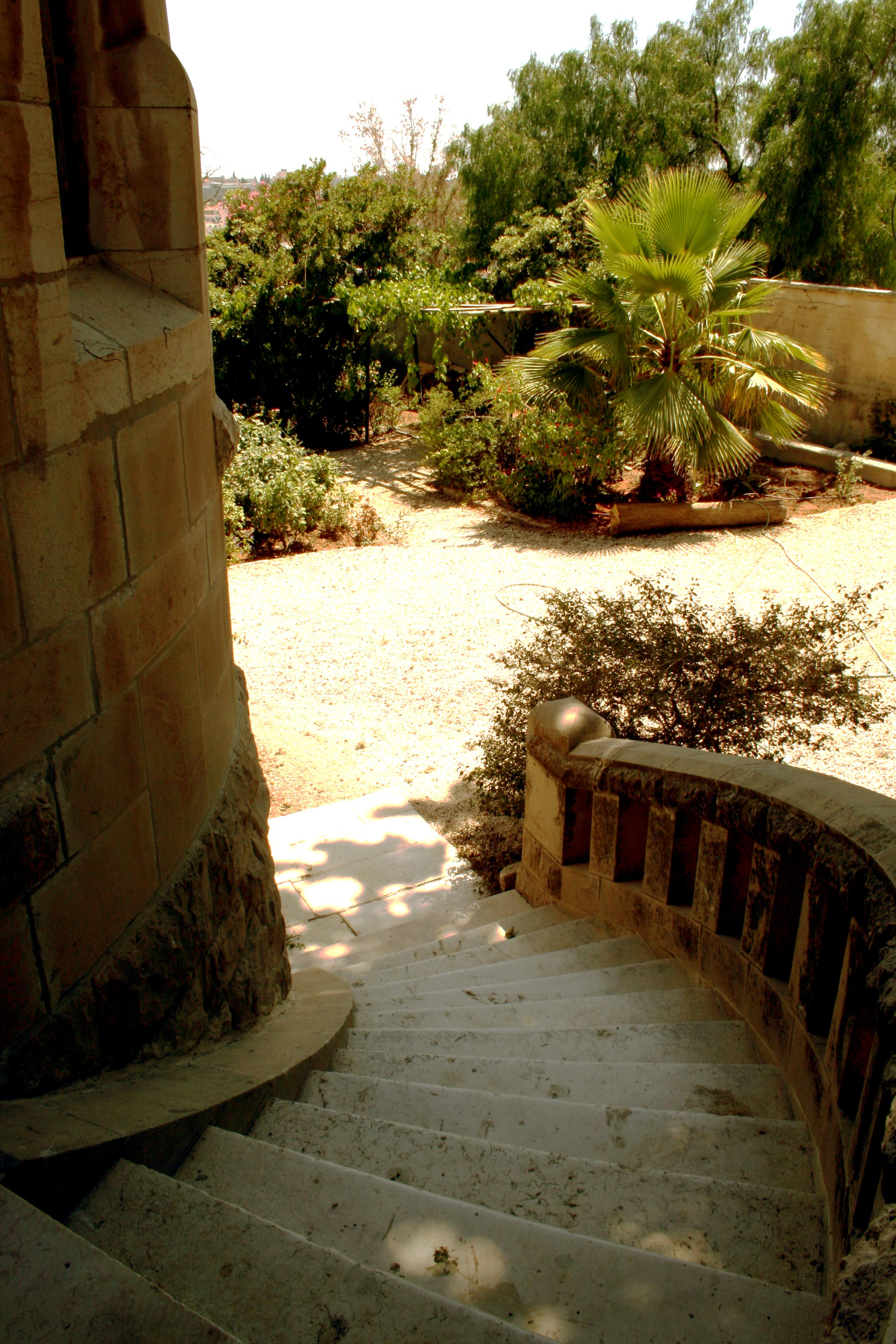
The entrance of the institute in Jerusalem in 2007

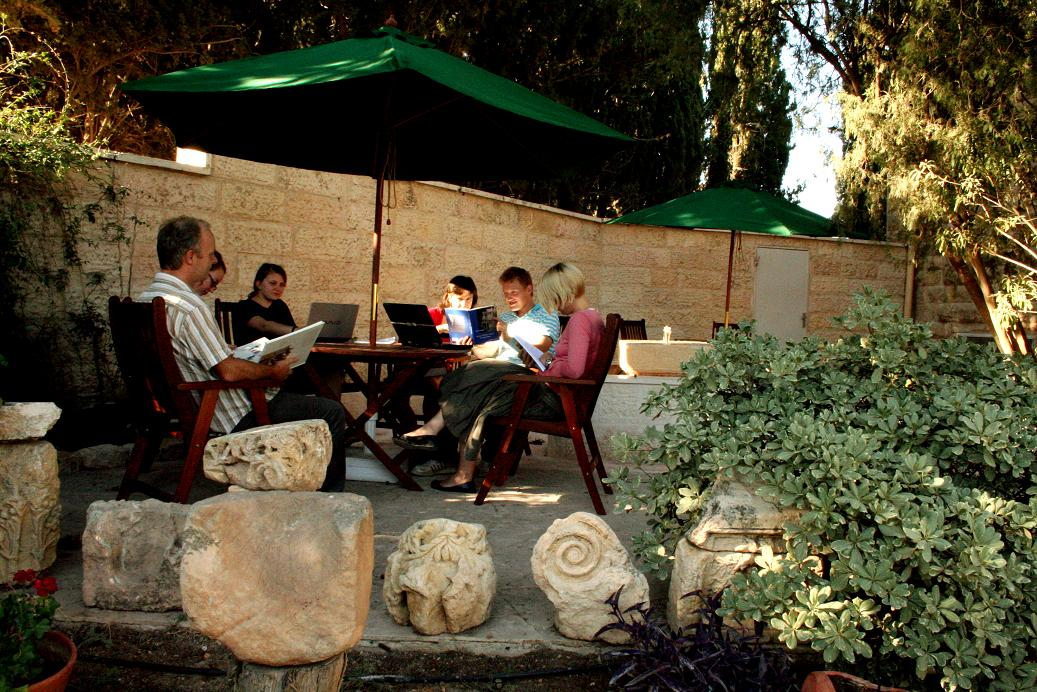
The garden of the institute in Jerusalem in 2007

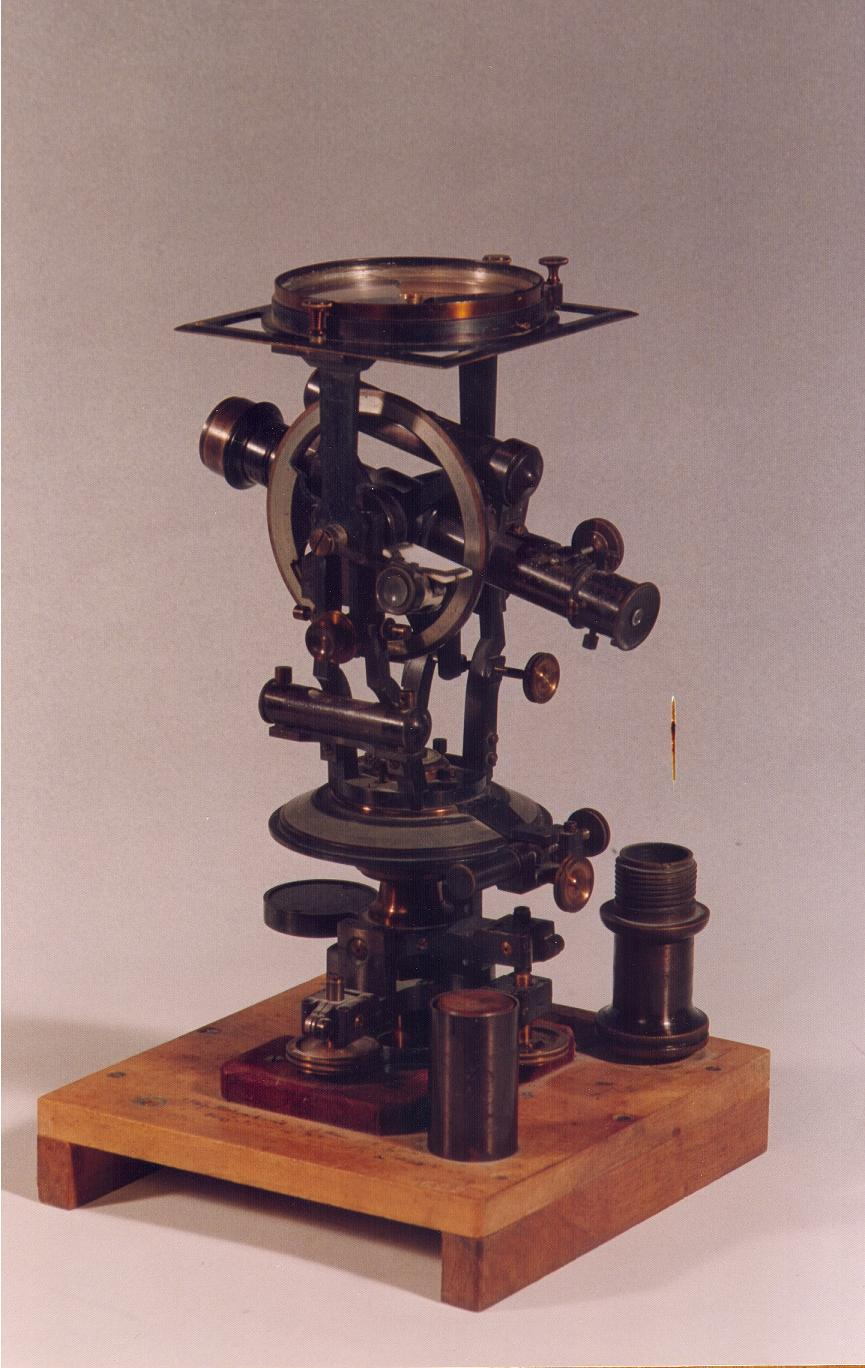
The theodolite used by Gottlieb Schumacher in the museum of the institute

The German Protestant Institute of Archaeology (GPIA), Research Unit of the German Archaeological Institute, founded in 1900, is a leading biblical archaeological institute in Jerusalem. Its German name is Deutsches Evangelisches Institut für Altertumswissenschaft des Heiligen Landes (DEI) which translates literally to the German Protestant Institute for Classical and Ancient Studies in the Holy Land.

== Institutes ==
The German Protestant Institute of Archaeology, Research Unit of the German Archaeological Institute has branches in Jerusalem and Amman. It serves as a meeting place for European scholars. The GPIA is administered by the Protestant Church in Germany, the umbrella body of German Protestant regional churches. At the same time, it serves as a research unit of the German Archaeological Institute (DAI). Dieter Vieweger is the director-general.

== Aims ==
The mission of the institute was clearly stated in its founding charter: the exploration of the Holy Land and its diverse past, cultures and religions. The knowledge acquired was meant to be available to, and discussed by, both experts and the general public. In light of this founding mission, the institute undertakes research on the history and culture of the region. To this end, the institute conducts its own excavations and supports other German research projects.

The institute is also committed to disseminating the results of research, especially in the areas of archaeology, cultural studies, theology and the Church. For this purpose, the institute maintains a research library, issues its own archaeological journal and organises meetings, lecture series and exhibitions. Especially important is the Course Programme for theologians, which was founded over 100 years ago by the first director, Gustaf Dalman. The institute also tries to make archaeological knowledge available to the public by offering guided tours of Jerusalem and the surrounding area.

The GPIA fosters close relations with the cultural institutions in the host countries and supports scientific research without any political or religious borders on both sides of the river Jordan.

== Archaeological projects ==
=== Tall Zira'a and the Gadara Region Project (Jordan) ===
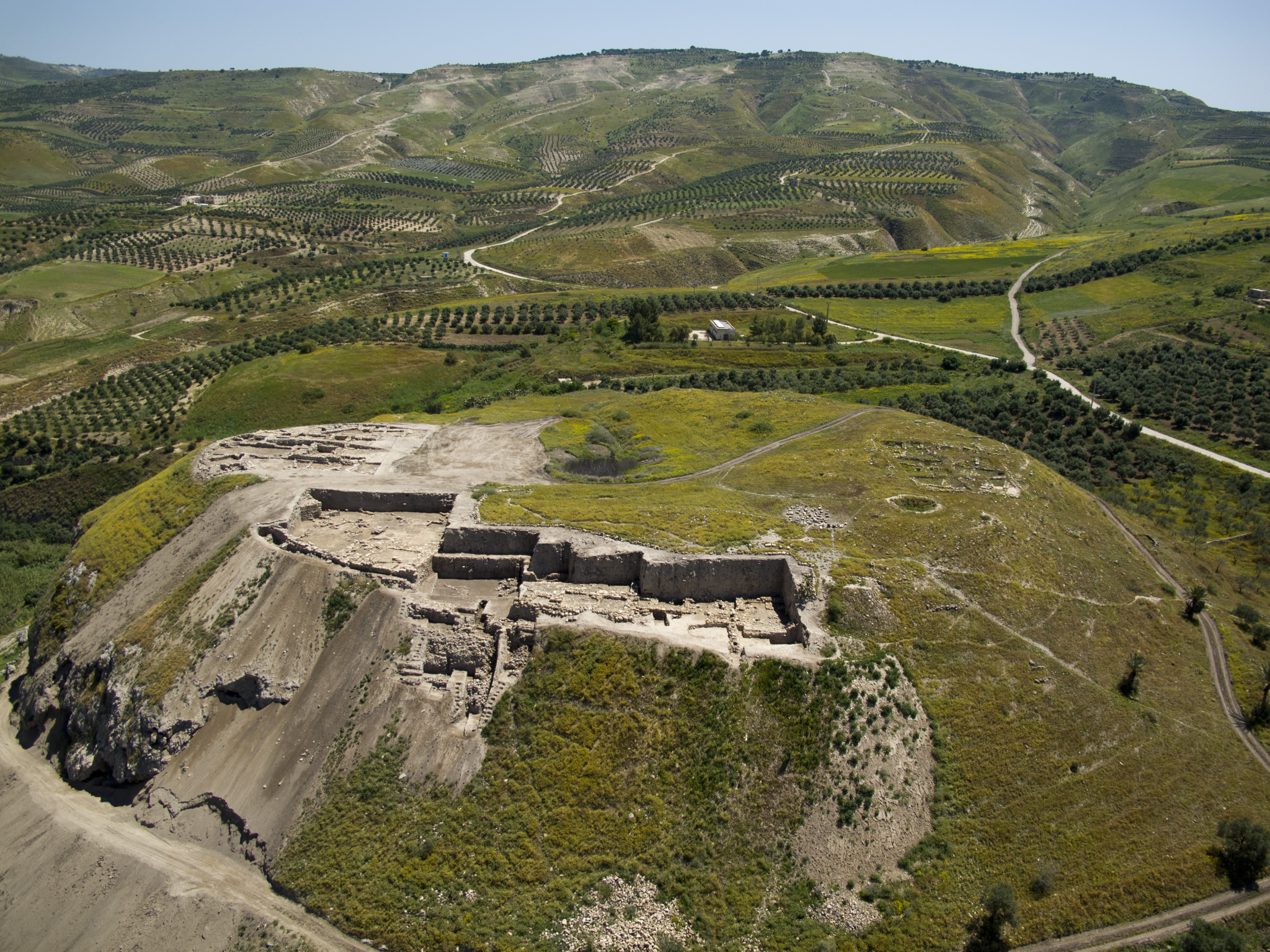
Tall Zira'a in 2011

Together with the Biblical Archaeological Institute in Wuppertal, the GPIA conducts the Gadara Region Project (2001–2020) in the Wadi al-'Arab, south of Umm Qais. The central archaeological site of the Wadi al-'Arab is the Tall Zira'a.

There is hardly an area of Palestine where its history can be studied in such a concentrated manner as in the Wadi al-'Arab. This deep valley, which lies roughly five kilometres south-west of the ancient Decapolis city of Gadara (today Umm Qais), is, in many ways, an archaeological bonanza due to the variety in what it has to offer. A number of springs, fertile soils and a moderate climate all provide for excellent living conditions, and the most imposing hill in the valley, Tall Zira'a, possesses its own artesian spring and the very best potential for settlement.

In addition, an important trade route ran through the wadi which once linked Egypt with Mesopotamia. The economic success and industriousness of the wadi's inhabitants have left plenty of traces over the millennia. Over one hundred sites mark out the distinguished history of human settlement in the region from the advent of sedentism to the Islamic period. Settlements, canals, water mills, cisterns, oil presses, wine presses, watch towers, graves and, above all, Tall Zira'a with its over 5000 years of settlement activity.

=== The archaeological park below the Church of the Redeemer (Jerusalem) ===
The archaeological park opened in November 2012 "The Times", located below the nave of the Church of the Redeemer was co-developed by German Protestant Institute (GPIA) and offers the possibility to commit more than 2000 years of history of the city of Jerusalem by walking through it.

The archaeological excavations, conducted by Conrad Schick 1893 und Ute Wagner-Lux (the former director of GPIA) respectively Karl Vriezen 1970–1974, have been prepared by the German Protestant Institute in the Holy Land in 2009–2012 to present visitors the different stages of development and building of Jerusalem.

=== Former projects ===
- Ute Wagner-Lux – Madaba / Jerusalem / Gadara,
- August Strobel – Kallirrhoë (En ez-Zara),
- Gunnar Lehmann; Martin Peilstöcker – Plain of Akko,
- Volkmar Fritz – Tell el-Oreme ('Oreimeh),
- Susanne Kerner – Gadara Tunnel System
- Thomas Weber – Gadara
- Hans-Dieter Bienert; Dieter Vieweger – Esh-Shallaf near Irbid,
- Hans-Dieter Bienert; Dieter Vieweger; Roland Lamprichs – Baja near Petra,
- Roland Lamprichs – Tall Johfieh,
- Michael Heinzelmann – Hippos.

== History ==
The GPIA was founded on June 19, 1900, by the Deutsche Evangelische Kirchenkonferenz in Eisenach in order to "maintain, further and regulate the relations between the holy places of biblical history, on the one hand, and between the scientific inquiry and the interests of the Christian faith of the Protestant Church, on the other, in the fields of biblical and ecclesiastical archaeology."

Gustaf Dalman – then Professor of Old Testament and Judaic Studies at the University of Leipzig – was appointed first director and built up the Jerusalem institute. The changed situation after the Six-Day War in June 1967 necessitated the establishment of the Amman institute. In 1982, the institute in Jerusalem moved to new buildings at the Auguste-Victoria-Compound on the Mount of Olives.

== Publications ==
- Palästinajahrbuch des Deutschen evangelischen Instituts für Altertumswissenschaft des heiligen Landes zu Jerusalem. Eighteen volumes published between 1905-1923 at Ernst Siegfried Mittler und Sohn, Berlin.
