= Kamon (name) =

Kamon may refer to the following people:

Given name

- Kamon Iizumi (飯泉 嘉門; born 1960), Japanese politician, governor of Tokushima Prefecture

Surname

- Karen Kamon (1951–2020), American singer and actress
- Tatsuo Kamon (嘉門 達夫; born 1959), Japanese singer-songwriter

== See also ==
- Camon (surname)
