= Kamon (Bible) =

Biblical place

Kamon or Camon (in Hebrew: קָמוֹן, in Ancient Greek: Καμων, transliterated as Kamôn) is a place mentioned in the Bible. Located in Gilead, it is said that Jair was buried there.

It is not yet clear whether it is a real place or primarily a symbolic one.

== History ==
=== Biblical account ===
According to the Book of Judges, Kamon is located in Gilead and is the place where Judge Jair is buried.

=== Sources ===
Kamon is mentioned only once in the Bible. While only one Hebrew name is given in the Masoretic text, both Καμων (Kamôn) and Ραμμω (Rhammô) are found in the Septuagint manuscripts.

In the 19th century, Easton believed it was probably located on the slopes of Mount Carmel. One possible etymology of the term could come from קָמָה (Qamāh), which means "to rise", possibly indicating that it was a fortified place situated on high ground. A place named Καμους (Kamous) was mentioned by Polybius and was conquered by Antiochus III. It might be the same location.

However, according to more recent research, the term might have a primarily symbolic meaning, deriving from the Greek Kαμίνος (Kaminos), which means "furnace". This interpretation is reinforced by Pseudo-Philo, who interprets a passage related to Jair by stating: "And in the fire in which you will die, there you will have a dwelling place."
