= Freimuth =

Surname with notable physicists, athletes and jumpers

Freimuth is a German surname. Notable people with the surname include:

- Axel Freimuth, German physicist
- Jörg Freimuth (born 1961), German high jumper
- Magnar Freimuth (born 1973), Estonian Nordic combined skier
- Rico Freimuth (born 1988), German decathlete
- Uwe Freimuth (born 1961), German decathlete

== See also ==
- Freimut, a German masculine given name and surname
