= Economic sociology =

Branch of sociology

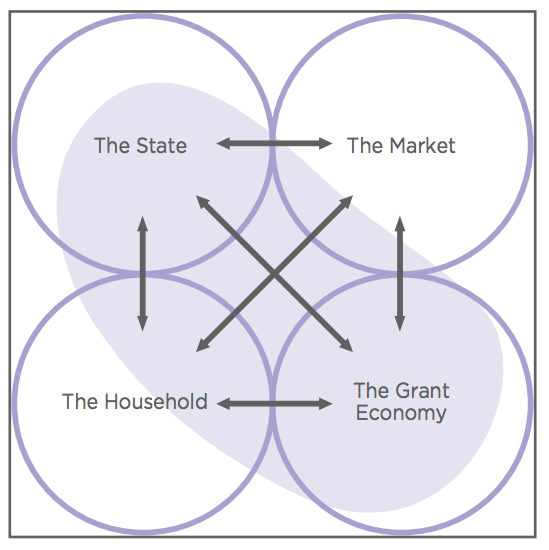
A diagram of actors facilitating economic exchange and their relations

Economic sociology is the study of the social cause and effect of various economic phenomena. The field can be broadly divided into a classical period and a contemporary one, known as "new economic sociology".

The classical period was concerned particularly with modernity and its constituent aspects, including rationalisation, secularisation, urbanisation, and social stratification. As sociology arose primarily as a reaction to capitalist modernity, economics played a role in much classic sociological inquiry. The specific term "economic sociology" was coined by William Stanley Jevons in 1879, later to be used in the works of Émile Durkheim, Max Weber and Georg Simmel between 1890 and 1920. Weber's work regarding the relationship between economics and religion and the cultural "disenchantment" of the modern West is perhaps most representative of the approach set forth in the classic period of economic sociology.

Contemporary economic sociology may include studies of all modern social aspects of economic phenomena; economic sociology may thus be considered a field in the intersection of economics and sociology. Frequent areas of inquiry in contemporary economic sociology include the social consequences of economic exchanges, the social meanings they involve and the social interactions they facilitate or obstruct.

== Classical ==
Economic sociology arose as a new approach to the analysis of economic phenomena; emphasizing particularly the role of economic structures and institutions that play upon society, and the influence a society holds over the nature of economic structures and institutions. The relationship between capitalism and modernity is a salient issue, perhaps best demonstrated in Weber's The Protestant Ethic and the Spirit of Capitalism (1905) and Simmel's The Philosophy of Money (1900). Economic sociology may be said to have begun with Tocqueville's Democracy in America (1835–40) and The Old Regime and the Revolution (1856). Marx's historical materialism would attempt to demonstrate how economic forces influence the structure of society on a fundamental level. Émile Durkheim's The Division of Labour in Society was published in 1922, whilst Max Weber's Economy and Society was released in the same year.

== Contemporary ==
Contemporary economic sociology focuses particularly on the social consequences of economic exchanges, the social meanings they involve and the social interactions they facilitate or obstruct. Influential figures in modern economic sociology include Fred L. Block, James S. Coleman, Paula England, Mark Granovetter, Harrison White, Paul DiMaggio, Joel M. Podolny, Lynette Spillman, Richard Swedberg and Viviana Zelizer in the United States, as well as Carlo Trigilia, Donald Angus MacKenzie, Laurent Thévenot and Jens Beckert in Europe. To this may be added Amitai Etzioni, who has developed the idea of socioeconomics, and Chuck Sabel, Wolfgang Streeck and Michael Mousseau who work in the tradition of political economy/sociology.

The focus on mathematical analysis and utility maximisation during the 20th century has led some to see economics as a discipline moving away from its roots in the social sciences. Many critiques of economics or economic policy begin from the accusation that abstract modelling is missing some key social phenomenon that needs to be addressed.

Economic sociology is an attempt by sociologists to redefine in sociological terms questions traditionally addressed by economists. It is thus also an answer to attempts by economists (such as Gary Becker) to bring economic approaches – in particular utility maximisation and game theory – to the analysis of social situations that are not obviously related to production or trade. Karl Polanyi, in his book The Great Transformation, was the first theorist to propose the idea of "embeddedness", meaning that the economy is "embedded" in social institutions which are vital so that the market does not destroy other aspects of human life. The concept of "embeddedness" serves sociologists who study technological developments. Mark Granovetter and Patrick McGuire mapped the social networks which determined the economics of the electrical industry in the United States. Ronen Shamir analyzed how electrification in Mandatory Palestine facilitated the creation of an ethnic-based dual-economy. Polanyi's form of market skepticism, however, has been criticized for intensifying rather than limiting the economization of society.

=== New economic sociology ===
A contemporary period of economic sociology, often known as new economic sociology, was consolidated by the 1985 work of Mark Granovetter titled "Economic Action and Social Structure: The Problem of Embeddedness". These works elaborated the concept of embeddedness, which states that economic relations between individuals or firms take place within existing social relations (and are thus structured by these relations as well as the greater social structures of which those relations are a part). Social network analysis has been the primary methodology for studying this phenomenon. Granovetter's theory of the strength of weak ties and Ronald Burt's concept of structural holes are two best known theoretical contributions of this field.

== Marxist sociology ==
Modern Marxist thought has focused on the social implications of capitalism (or "commodity fetishism") and economic development within the system of economic relations that produce them. Important theorists include Georg Lukács, Theodor Adorno, Max Horkheimer, Walter Benjamin, Guy Debord, Louis Althusser, Nicos Poulantzas, Ralph Miliband, Jürgen Habermas, Raymond Williams, Fredric Jameson, Antonio Negri, and Stuart Hall.

== Socioeconomics ==
Economic sociology is sometimes synonymous with socioeconomics. Socioeconomics deals with the analytical, political and moral questions arising at the intersection between economy and society from a broad interdisciplinary perspective with links beyond sociology to political economy, moral philosophy, institutional economics and history.

== Academic associations ==
The Society for the Advancement of Socio-Economics (SASE) is an international academic association whose members are involved in social studies of economy and economic processes. The Socio-Economic Review was established as the official journal of SASE in 2003. The journal aims to encourage work on the relationship between society, economy, institutions and markets, moral commitments and the rational pursuit of self-interest. Most articles focus on economic action in its social and historical context, drawing from sociology, political science, economics and the management and policy sciences. According to the Journal Citation Reports, the journal has a 2015 impact factor of 1.926, ranking it 56th out of 344 journals in the category "Economics", 21st out of 163 journals in the category "Political Science" and 19th out of 142 journals in the category "Sociology".

The American Sociological Association's Economic Sociology section became a permanent Section in January 2001. According to its website, it has about 800 members.

Another group of scholars in this area works as Research Committee in Economy and Society (RC02) within the International Sociological Association.

Economic Sociology and Political Economy (ES/PE), founded in 2011, is an online scholarly society that gathers researchers interested in economic sociology and related topics.

== See also ==
- Behavioral economics – Factors influencing economic decisions
- Behavioral strategy
- Cultural economics – Branch of economics
- Critique of political economy – Social critique
- Economic anthropology – Academic field
- Economic democracy – Socioeconomic philosophy
- Economics empiricism – Social science studying goods and services
- Fiscal sociology – Sociology of public finance
- Industrial sociology – Branch of the discipline of sociology
- Political economy – Study of the development of social production
