= Axel Freimuth =

German physicist

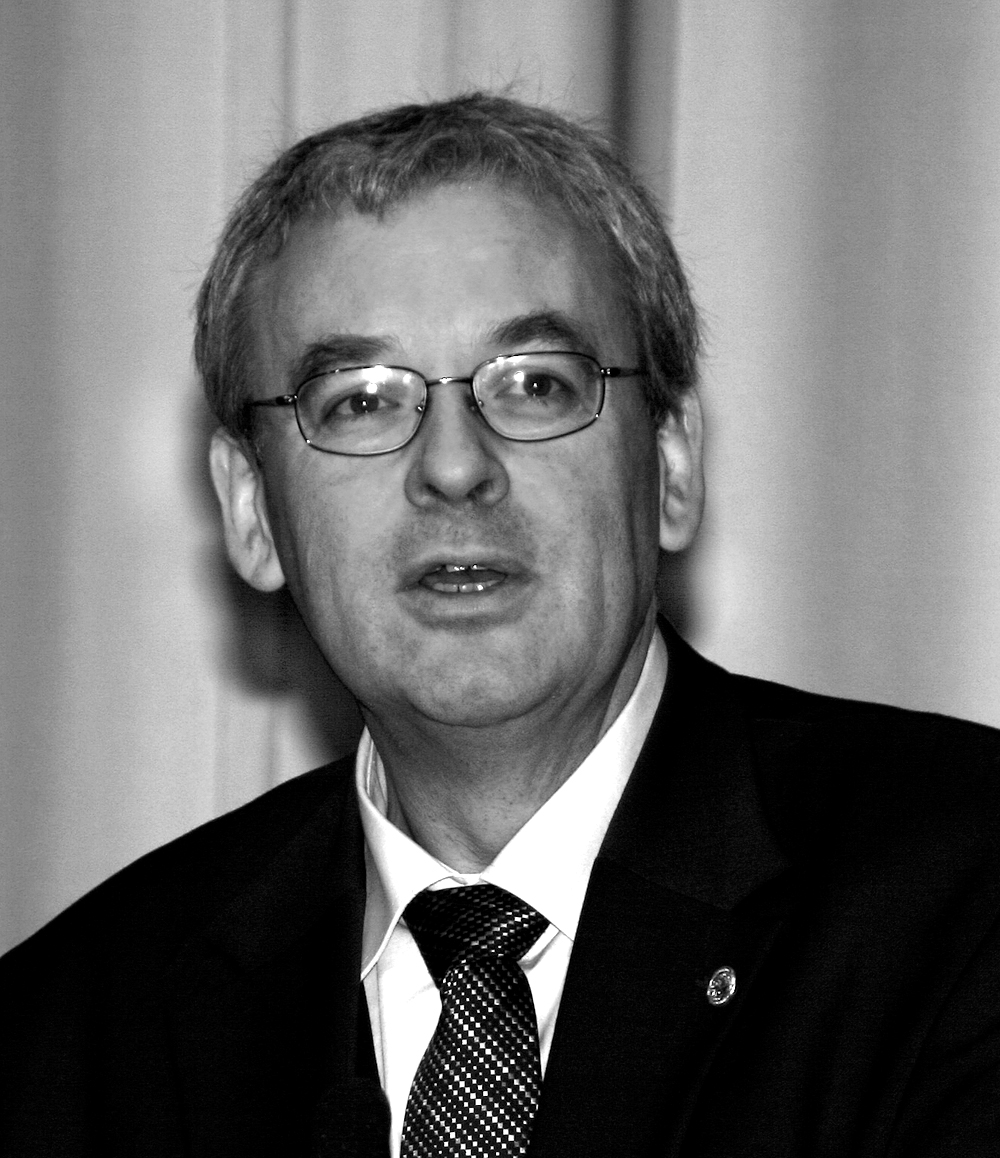
Axel Freimuth in 2007

Axel Freimuth (born 27 October 1957) is a German physicist. On 1 April 2005 he succeeded the mathematician Tassilo Küpper as Rector of University of Cologne. His initial appointment was for a term of four years but this has subsequently been extended.

== Early life and education ==
Freimuth was born in Duisburg. He studied physics at the University of Cologne, receiving his doctorate and 1989 and his post-doctoral habilitation in 1994. His dissertations were titled as follows:

- 1989 Über die Transporteigenschaften valenzinstabiler Verbindungen
- 1994 Transporteigenschaften im gemischten Zustand der Hochtemperatur-Supraleiter

While a student he also took work as a supply teacher at the comprehensive school in Cologne-Chorweiler and further supplemented his income by working as a truck driver, although in a later interview he insisted that during those years he never lost sight of his core academic goals.

== Career ==
In 1996 Freimuth accepted an invitation to transfer to Karlsruhe (KIT) as a professor of physics at the university Physics Institute. However, in 1998 he was tempted back to Cologne, accepting a "C-4 professorship" in experimental solid state physics. His principal areas of research within the field of solid state physics include superconductivity, magnetism and electronic strongly correlated matter.

Freimuth was chair of the University Physics Group between April 2000 and 2003. In 2002 he undertook a research stay at the University of British Columbia in Vancouver.

In 2003 he became dean of the Faculty for Mathematics and Natural Sciences at Cologne, and in April 2005 he became the university's forty-ninth rector since 1919. At the end of 2005 he was invited to take on the leadership of the prestigious Jülich Research Centre but turned down the invitation in order to renew his contract for the rectorship at Cologne where he has become the longest serving university rector in more than a century. He served between 2008 and 2010 as chair of the regional rectors' conference and of the Cologne Sciences Forum ("Kölner Wissenschaftsrunde"). He also involved himself with the German Physics Society ("Deutsche Physikalische Gesellschaft" / DPG) and in committees of the Munich-based Max Planck Society.

== Other activities ==
=== Corporate boards ===
- Deutsche Bank, member of the advisory board

=== Non-profit organizations ===
- LMU Munich, Member of the Board of Trustees (since 2026)
- Konrad Adenauer Prize, member of the advisory board
- Max Planck Institute for Biology of Ageing, member of the board of trustees
- Max Planck Institute for Metabolism Research, member of the board of trustees
- Max Planck Institute for Plant Breeding Research, member of the board of trustees
- Max Planck Institute for Radio Astronomy, member of the board of trustees
- Max Planck Institute for the Study of Societies (MPIfG), member of the board of trustees
- University of Cologne, Centre for Financial Research (CFR), member of the advisory board

== Recognition ==
In 2014 Freimuth came second in the election for "University rector of the year", organised by the University Teachers' Association ("Deutscher Hochschulverband" / DHV), beaten to top position by second time winner Lambert T. Koch of Wuppertal.

== Personal life ==
Asked about his hobbies, Freimuth disclosed that he tries to find half an hour to play the guitar each evening, sometimes playing along to film music on the television. He also likes to cook. He went on to indicate, however, that his family are less than enthusiastic about his guitar playing, and the cooking loses its appeal when he is dieting.
