= UBW =

UBW may refer to:

- UbW stands for U-Boot-Waffe (or U-Bootwaffe), the U-boat Arm of the German Navy during two world wars
- Ugnu-Kuparuk Airport (FAA LID code)
- Union of Bulgarian Writers of which Nikolay Haytov is a member
- United By Walter, a fan site for Walter Schreifels
- Unlimited Blade Works, Fate/stay night visual novel plotline
  - Fate/stay night: Unlimited Blade Works (2010 film), anime film based on the visual novel plotline
  - Fate/stay night: Unlimited Blade Works (TV series), anime TV series based on the visual novel plotline
- Urban Bush Women dance group
- University Library of Wuppertal (Universitätsbibliothek Wuppertal), Germany
