= Jürgen Gerlach =

Jürgen Gerlach may refer to:

- Jürgen Gerlach (canoeist) (born 1948), German Olympian
- Jürgen Gerlach (engineer) (born 1963), German academic
