= Swedberg =

Swedberg is a Swedish surname. Notable people with the surname include:

- Emanuel Swedberg, the birth name of Emanuel Swedenborg, Swedish scientist and philosopher
- Heidi Swedberg (born 1966), American actress and musician
- Jesper Swedberg (1653–1735), Swedish bishop
- Malin Swedberg (born 1968), Swedish footballer
- Richard Swedberg, Swedish sociologist
- Williot Swedberg, (born 2004), Swedish footballer
