= Tax =

Compulsory contribution to state revenue

A tax is a mandatory financial charge or levy imposed on an individual or legal entity by a governmental organization to support government spending and public expenditures collectively or to regulate economic activity through measures designed to mitigate negative externalities. Tax compliance refers to policy actions and individual behavior aimed at ensuring that taxpayers are paying the right amount of tax at the right time and securing the correct tax allowances and tax relief.

In economic terms (circular flow of income), taxation transfers wealth from households or businesses to the government. This affects economic growth and welfare, which can be increased (known as fiscal multiplier) or decreased (known as excess burden of taxation).

Certain countries (usually small in size or population, which results in a smaller infrastructure and social expenditure) function as tax havens by imposing minimal taxes on the personal income of individuals and corporate income. These tax havens attract capital from abroad (particularly from larger economies) while resulting in loss of tax revenues within other non-haven countries (through base erosion and profit shifting).

== History ==
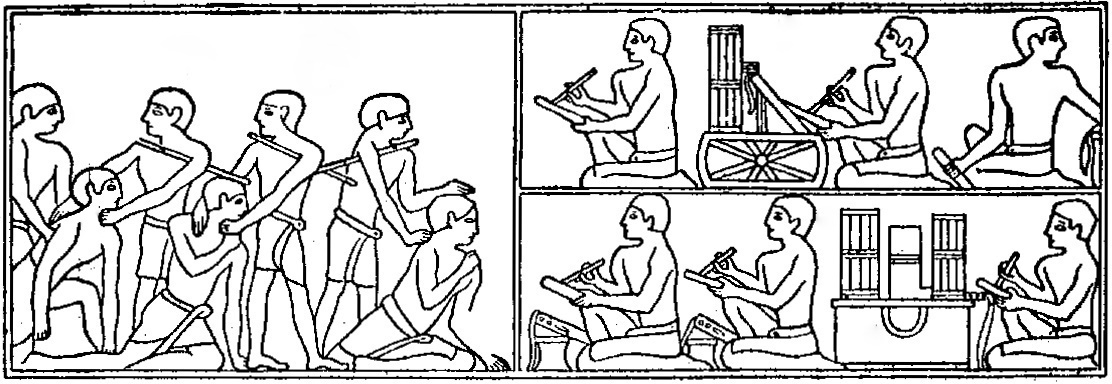
Egyptian peasants seized for non-payment of taxes. (Pyramid Age)

The first known system of taxation was in Ancient Egypt around 3000–2800 BC, in the First Dynasty of the Old Kingdom of Egypt. The earliest and most widespread forms of taxation were the corvée and the tithe: The corvée was forced labor provided to the state by peasants too poor to pay other forms of taxation (labor in ancient Egyptian is a synonym for taxes). Records from the time document that the Pharaoh would conduct a biennial tour of the kingdom, collecting tithes from the people. The Rosetta Stone, whose decipherment led to the contemporary understanding of hieroglyphics, was itself a decree issued by Ptolemy V that contained tax concessions.

Early examples of taxation are also seen in the Bible, ancient Vedic texts, the Bronze-age Hittite Empire, and the Persian Empire.

=== Roman and civil law ===
In the Roman Republic, taxes were collected from individuals at the rate of between 1% and 3% of the assessed value of their total property. However, since it was extremely difficult to facilitate the collection of the tax, the government auctioned it every year. The winning tax farmers (called publicani) paid the tax revenue to the government in advance and then kept the taxes collected from individuals. The publicani paid the tax revenue in coins, but collected the taxes using other exchange media, thus relieving the government of the work to carry out the currency conversion themselves. The revenue payment essentially worked as a loan to the government, which paid interest on it. Although this scheme was a profitable enterprise for the government as well as the publicani, it was later replaced by a direct tax system by the emperor Augustus; after which, each province was obliged to pay 1% tax on wealth and a flat rate on each adult. This brought about regular census and shifted the tax system more towards taxing an individual's income rather than wealth.

=== Islamic law ===
Islamic rulers imposed Zakat (a tax on Muslims) and Jizya (a poll tax on conquered non-Muslims).

=== Modern history ===
Numerous records of government tax collection in Europe since at least the 17th century are still available today. But taxation levels are hard to compare to the size and flow of the economy since production numbers are not as readily available. Taxation as a percentage of production of final goods may have reached 15–20% during the 17th century in places such as France, the Netherlands, and Scandinavia.

During the war-filled years of the eighteenth and early nineteenth century, tax rates in Europe increased dramatically as war became more expensive and governments became more centralized and adept at gathering taxes. This increase was greatest in England. Effective tax rates were higher in Britain than France in the years before the French Revolution, but they were mostly placed on international trade. In France, taxes were lower but the burden was mainly on landowners, individuals, and internal trade and thus created far more resentment.

=== Obsolete forms ===
Obsolete forms of taxation include:

- In monetary economies prior to fiat banking, a critical form of taxation was seigniorage, the tax on the creation of money.
- Scutage, which is paid in lieu of military service; strictly speaking, it is a commutation of a non-tax obligation rather than a tax as such but functioning as a tax in practice.
- Tallage, a tax on feudal dependents.
- Tithe, a tax-like payment (one-tenth of one's earnings or agricultural produce), paid to the Church (and thus too specific to be a tax in strict technical terms). This should not be confused with the modern practice of the same name which is normally voluntary.
- (Feudal) aids, a type of tax or due that was paid by a vassal to his lord during feudal times.
- Danegeld, a medieval land tax originally raised to pay off raiding Danes and later used to fund military expenditures.
- Carucage, a tax which replaced the Danegeld in England.
- Tax farming, the principle of assigning the responsibility for tax revenue collection to private citizens or groups.
- Socage, a feudal tax system based on land rent.
- Burgage, a feudal tax system based on land rent.

== Taxonomy and classification ==
The Organisation for Economic Co-operation and Development (OECD) publishes an analysis of the tax systems of member countries. As part of such analysis, OECD has developed a definition and system of classification of internal taxes.

OECD Interpretative Guide tax codes and classifications
1000	Taxes on income, profits and capital gains of individuals and corporations			
	1100	Taxes on income, profits and capital gains of individuals		
		1110	Taxes on income and profits of individuals	
		1120	Taxes on capital gains of individuals	
	1200	Corporate taxes on income, profits and capital gains of corporations		
		1210	Taxes on income and profits of corporations	
		1220	Taxes on capital gains of corporations	
	1300	Unallocable between taxes on income, profits and capital gains of individuals and corporations		
2000	Social security contributions (SSC)			
	2100	Social security contributions (SSC) by employees		
		2110	Social security contributions (SSC) by employees, payroll basis	
		2120	Social security contributions (SSC) by employees, income tax basis	
	2200	Social security contributions (SSC) by employers		
		2210	Social security contributions (SSC) by employers, payroll basis	
		2220	Social security contributions (SSC) by employers, income tax basis	
	2300	Social security contributions (SSC) by self-employed or non-employed		
		2310	Social security contributions (SSC) by self-employed or non-employed, payroll basis	
		2320	Social security contributions (SSC) by self-employed or non-employed, income tax basis	
	2400	Social security contributions (SSC) unallocable between employees, employers and self-employed or non-employed		
		2410	Social security contributions (SSC) unallocable between employees, employers and self-employed or non-employed, payroll basis	
		2420	Social security contributions (SSC) unallocable between employees, employers and self-employed or non-employed, income tax basis	
3000	Taxes on payroll and workforce			
4000	Taxes on property			
	4100	Recurrent taxes on immovable property		
		4110	Recurrent taxes on immovable property of households	
		4120	Recurrent taxes on immovable property paid by agents other than households	
	4200	Recurrent taxes on net wealth		
		4210	Recurrent taxes on net wealth of individuals	
		4220	Recurrent taxes on net wealth of corporations	
	4300	Estate, inheritance and gift taxes		
		4310	Estate and inheritance taxes	
		4320	Gift taxes	
	4400	Taxes on financial and capital transactions		
	4500	Other non-recurrent taxes on property		
		4510	Other non-recurrent taxes on property on net wealth	
		4520	Other non-recurrent taxes on property other than on net wealth	
	4600	Other recurrent taxes on property		
5000	Taxes on goods and services			
	5100	Taxes on production, sale, transfer, leasing and delivery of goods and rendering of services		
		5110	General taxes on goods and services	
			5111	Value added taxes (VAT)
			5112	Sales taxes
			5113	Turnover and other general taxes on goods and services
		5120	Taxes on specific goods and services	
			5121	Excises
			5122	Profits of fiscal monopolies
			5123	Customs and other import duties
			5124	Taxes on exports
			5125	Taxes on investment goods
			5126	Taxes on specific services
			5127	Other taxes on international trade and transactions
			5128	Other taxes on specific goods and services
		5130	Unallocable between general taxes and taxes on specific goods and services	
	5200	Taxes on use of goods, or on permission to use goods or perform activities		
		5210	Recurrent taxes on use of goods, or on permission to use goods or perform activities	
			5211	Recurrent taxes on motor vehicles, paid by households
			5212	Recurrent taxes on motor vehicles, paid by others
			5213	Recurrent taxes on use of goods, or on permission to use goods or perform activities, other than motor vehicles
		5220	Non-recurrent taxes on use of goods, or on permission to use goods, or perform activities	
	5300	Unallocable between taxes on production, sale, transfer, leasing and delivery of goods and rendering of services and taxes on use of goods, or on permission to use goods, or perform activities		
6000	Other taxes			
	6100	Other taxes paid solely by business		
	6200	Other taxes paid by other than business, or unidentifiable		

=== Social-security contributions ===
Many countries provide publicly funded retirement or healthcare systems.

=== Property ===
==== Property taxes ====
In contrast with a tax on real estate (land and buildings), a land-value tax (LVT) is levied only on the unimproved value of the land ("land" in this instance may mean either the economic term, i.e., all-natural resources, or the natural resources associated with specific areas of the Earth's surface: "lots" or "land parcels"). Proponents of the land-value tax argue that it is economically justified, as it will not deter production, distort market mechanisms or otherwise create deadweight losses the way other taxes do.

In a number of jurisdictions (including multiple American states), there is a general tax levied periodically on residents who own personal property (personalty) within the jurisdiction. Vehicle and boat registration fees are subsets of this kind of tax. The tax is often designed with blanket coverage and large exceptions for things like food and clothing. Household goods are often exempt when kept or used within the household. Any otherwise non-exempt object can lose its exemption if regularly kept outside the household. Thus, tax collectors often monitor newspaper articles for stories about wealthy people who have lent art to museums for public display, because the artworks have then become subject to personal property tax. If an artwork had to be sent to another state for some touch-ups, it may have become subject to personal property tax in that state as well.

==== Inheritance ====
Inheritance tax, also called estate tax, are taxes that arise for inheritance or inherited income.

==== Expatriation ====
An expatriation tax is a tax on individuals who renounce their citizenship or residence. The tax is often imposed based on a deemed disposition of all the individual's property. One example is the United States under the American Jobs Creation Act, where any individual who has a net worth of $2 million or an average income-tax liability of $127,000 who renounces his or her citizenship and leaves the country is automatically assumed to have done so for tax avoidance reasons and is subject to a higher tax rate.

==== Remittance ====
A remittance tax is an excise tax levied on international money transfers, typically paid by a sender to a recipient in a foreign country. Governments may do this to raise revenue, discourage immigration and illicit financing, or in some cases address capital flight by discouraging excess outflows. An example is in the U.S. on the One big beautiful Bill, there is a 1% remittance tax for transferring money overseas. Supporters of this tax say that this will reduce illegal immigration, raise revenue, and address illicit funds, while critics say this will disproportionately affect poor people and countries who rely on remittances and that it may either discourage sending money to their families or force them to cut back on spending domestically, which will impact the economy.

==== Wealth ====
A wealth tax is levied on the total value of personal assets, including: bank deposits, real estate, assets in insurance and pension plans, ownership of unincorporated businesses, financial securities, and personal trusts.

=== Goods and services ===
==== Value added ====
Many tax authorities have introduced automated VAT which has increased accountability and auditability, by utilizing computer systems, thereby also enabling anti-cybercrime offices as well.

==== Sales ====
A small number of U.S. states rely entirely on sales taxes or Internet tax for state revenue, as those states do not levy a state income tax. Such states tend to have a moderate to a large amount of tourism or inter-state travel that occurs within their borders, allowing the state to benefit from taxes from people the state would otherwise not tax. In this way, the state is able to reduce the tax burden on its citizens. The U.S. states that do not levy a state income tax are Alaska, Tennessee, Florida, Nevada, South Dakota, Texas, Washington state, and Wyoming. Additionally, New Hampshire and Tennessee levy state income taxes only on dividends and interest income. Of the above states, only Alaska and New Hampshire do not levy a state sales tax.

==== Excises ====
An excise duty is an indirect tax imposed upon goods during the process of their manufacture, production or distribution, and is usually proportionate to their quantity or value. Excise duties were first introduced into England in the year 1643, as part of a scheme of revenue and taxation devised by parliamentarian John Pym and approved by the Long Parliament. These duties consisted of charges on beer, ale, cider, cherry wine, and tobacco, to which list were afterward added paper, soap, candles, malt, hops, and sweets. The basic principle of excise duties was that they were taxes on the production, manufacture, or distribution of articles which could not be taxed through the customs house, and revenue derived from that source is called excise revenue proper. The fundamental conception of the term is that of a tax on articles produced or manufactured in a country. In the taxation of such articles of luxury as spirits, beer, tobacco, and cigars, it has been the practice to place a certain duty on the importation of these articles (a customs duty).

=== Other ===
- A poll tax, also called a per capita tax, or capitation tax, is a tax that levies a set amount per individual. It is an example of the concept of fixed tax. One of the earliest taxes mentioned in the Bible of a half-shekel per annum from each adult Jew (Ex. 30:11–16) was a form of the poll tax. Poll taxes are administratively cheap because they are easy to compute and collect and difficult to cheat. Economists have considered poll taxes economically efficient because people are presumed to be in fixed supply and poll taxes, therefore, do not lead to economic distortions. However, poll taxes are unpopular because poorer people pay a higher proportion of their income than richer people. In addition, the supply of people is in fact not fixed over time: on average, couples will choose to have fewer children if a poll tax is imposed.
- Bank tax
- Financial transaction taxes including currency transaction taxes
- Tax on monopolists

==== Effective and economic taxes ====
Governments may charge user fees, tolls, or other types of assessments in exchange of particular goods, services, or use of property. These are generally not considered taxes, as long as they are levied as payment for a direct benefit to the individual paying.

Some scholars refer to certain economic effects as taxes, though they are not levies imposed by governments. These include:

- Inflation tax: the economic disadvantage suffered by holders of cash and cash equivalents in one denomination of currency due to the effects of expansionary monetary policy
- Financial repression: Government policies such as interest-rate caps on government debt, financial regulations such as reserve requirements and capital controls, and barriers to entry in markets where the government owns or controls businesses.

== Law ==
=== Proportional, progressive, regressive, and lump sum ===
An important feature of tax systems is the percentage of the tax burden as it relates to income or consumption. The terms progressive, regressive, and proportional are used to describe the way the rate progresses from low to high, from high to low, or proportionally. The terms describe a distribution effect, which can be applied to any type of tax system (income or consumption) that meets the definition.

- A progressive tax is a tax imposed so that the effective tax rate increases as the amount to which the rate is applied increases.
- The opposite of a progressive tax is a regressive tax, where the effective tax rate decreases as the amount to which the rate is applied increases. This effect is commonly produced where means testing is used to withdraw tax allowances or state benefits.
- In between is a proportional tax, where the effective tax rate is fixed, while the amount to which the rate is applied increases.
- A lump-sum tax is a tax that is a fixed amount, no matter the change in circumstance of the taxed entity. This in actuality is a regressive tax as those with lower income must use a higher percentage of their income than those with higher income and therefore the effect of the tax reduces as a function of income.

The terms can also be used to apply meaning to the taxation of select consumption, such as a tax on luxury goods and the exemption of basic necessities may be described as having progressive effects as it increases a tax burden on high end consumption and decreases a tax burden on low end consumption.

=== Direct and indirect ===
Taxes are sometimes referred to as "direct taxes" or "indirect taxes". The meaning of these terms can vary in different contexts, which can sometimes lead to confusion. An economic definition, by Atkinson, states that "...direct taxes may be adjusted to the individual characteristics of the taxpayer, whereas indirect taxes are levied on transactions irrespective of the circumstances of buyer or seller."

== Economics ==
Public finance revenue from taxes in % of GDP. For this data, 32% of the variance of GDP per capita – adjusted for purchasing power parity (PPP) – is explained by revenue from social security and the like.

In economic terms, taxation transfers wealth from households or businesses to the government of a nation. The side-effects of taxation (such as economic distortions) and theories about how best to tax are an important subject in microeconomics. Economic theories of taxation approach the question of how to maximize economic welfare through taxation.

=== Incidence ===
Law establishes from whom a tax is collected. In a number of countries, taxes are imposed on businesses (such as corporate taxes or portions of payroll taxes). However, who ultimately pays the tax (the tax "burden") is determined by the marketplace as taxes become embedded into production costs. Economic theory suggests that the economic effect of tax does not necessarily fall at the point where it is legally levied. For instance, a tax on employment paid by employers will impact the employee, at least in the long run. The greatest share of the tax burden tends to fall on the most inelastic factor involved—the part of the transaction which is affected least by a change in price. So, for instance, a tax on wages in a town will (at least in the long run) affect property-owners in that area.

Depending on how quantities supplied and demanded to vary with price (the "elasticities" of supply and demand), a tax can be absorbed by the seller (in the form of lower pre-tax prices), or by the buyer (in the form of higher post-tax prices). If the elasticity of supply is low, more of the tax will be paid by the supplier. If the elasticity of demand is low, more will be paid by the customer; and, contrariwise for the cases where those elasticities are high. If the seller is a competitive firm, the tax burden is distributed over the factors of production depending on the elasticities thereof; this includes workers (in the form of lower wages), capital investors (in the form of loss to shareholders), landowners (in the form of lower rents), entrepreneurs (in the form of lower wages of superintendence) and customers (in the form of higher prices).

=== Increased economic welfare ===
==== Pigovian ====
The existence of a tax can increase economic efficiency in some cases. If there is a negative externality associated with a good (meaning that it has negative effects not felt by the consumer) then a free market will trade too much of that good. By taxing the good, the government can raise revenue to address specific problems while increasing overall welfare.

The goal is to tax people when they are creating societal costs in addition to their personal costs. By taxing goods with negative externalities, the government attempts to increase economic efficiency while raising revenues.

This type of tax is called a Pigovian tax, after economist Arthur Pigou who wrote about it in his 1920 book "The Economics of Welfare".

Pigovian taxes might target the undesirable production of greenhouse gases which cause climate change (namely a carbon tax), polluting fuels (such as petrol), water or air pollution (namely an ecotax), goods which incur public healthcare costs (such as alcohol or tobacco), and excess demand of certain public goods (such as traffic congestion pricing). The idea is to aim taxes at people that cause an above-average amount of societal harm so the free market incorporates all costs as opposed to only personal costs, with the benefit of lowering the overall tax burden for people who cause less societal harm.

==== Reduced inequality ====
Progressive taxation generally reduces economic inequality through redistribution.

=== Reduced economic welfare ===
Most taxes (see below) have side effects that reduce economic welfare, either by mandating unproductive labor (compliance costs) or by creating distortions to economic incentives (deadweight loss and perverse incentives).

==== Deadweight costs ====
Diagram illustrating deadweight costs of taxes

In the absence of negative externalities, the introduction of taxes into a market reduces economic efficiency by causing deadweight loss. In a competitive market, the price of a particular economic good adjusts to ensure that all trades which benefit both the buyer and the seller of a good occur. The introduction of a tax causes the price received by the seller to be less than the cost to the buyer by the amount of the tax. This causes fewer transactions to occur, which reduces economic welfare; the individuals or businesses involved are less well off than before the tax. The tax burden and the amount of deadweight cost is dependent on the elasticity of supply and demand for the good taxed.

Most taxes—including income tax and sales tax—can have significant deadweight costs. The only way to avoid deadweight costs in an economy that is generally competitive is to refrain from taxes that change economic incentives. Such taxes include the land value tax, where the tax is on a good in completely inelastic supply. By taxing the value of unimproved land as opposed to what's built on it, a land value tax does not increase taxes on landowners for improving their land. This is opposed to traditional property taxes which reward land abandonment and disincentivize construction, maintenance, and repair. Another example of a tax with few deadweight costs is a lump sum tax such as a poll tax (head tax) which is paid by all adults regardless of their choices. Arguably a windfall profits tax which is entirely unanticipated can also fall into this category.

Deadweight loss does not account for the effect taxes have in leveling the business playing field. Businesses that have more money are better suited to fend off competition. It is common that an industry with a small amount of large corporations has a high barrier of entry for new entrants coming into the marketplace. This is due to the fact that the larger the corporation, the better its position to negotiate with suppliers. Also, larger companies may be able to operate at low or even negative profits for extended periods of time, thus pushing out competition. More progressive taxation of profits, however, would reduce such barriers for new entrants, thereby increasing competition and ultimately benefiting consumers.

== Policy ==
Adam Smith writes in The Wealth of Nations that

"…the economic incomes of private people are of three main types: rent, profit, and wages. Ordinary taxpayers will ultimately pay their taxes from at least one of these revenue sources. The government may intend that a particular tax should fall exclusively on rent, profit, or wages – and that another tax should fall on all three private income sources jointly. However, many taxes will inevitably fall on resources and persons very different from those intended … Good taxes meet four major criteria. They are (1) proportionate to incomes or abilities to pay (2) certain rather than arbitrary (3) payable at times and in ways convenient to the taxpayers and (4) cheap to administer and collect."

According to the proponents of the chartalist theory of money creation, taxes are not needed for government revenue, as long as the government in question is able to issue fiat money. According to this view, the purpose of taxation is to maintain the stability of the currency, express public policy regarding the distribution of wealth, subsidizing certain industries or population groups or isolating the costs of certain benefits, such as highways or social security.

A 2019 study looking at the impact of tax cuts for different income groups, it was tax cuts for low-income groups that had the greatest positive impact on employment growth. Tax cuts for the wealthiest top 10% had a small impact.

=== International ===
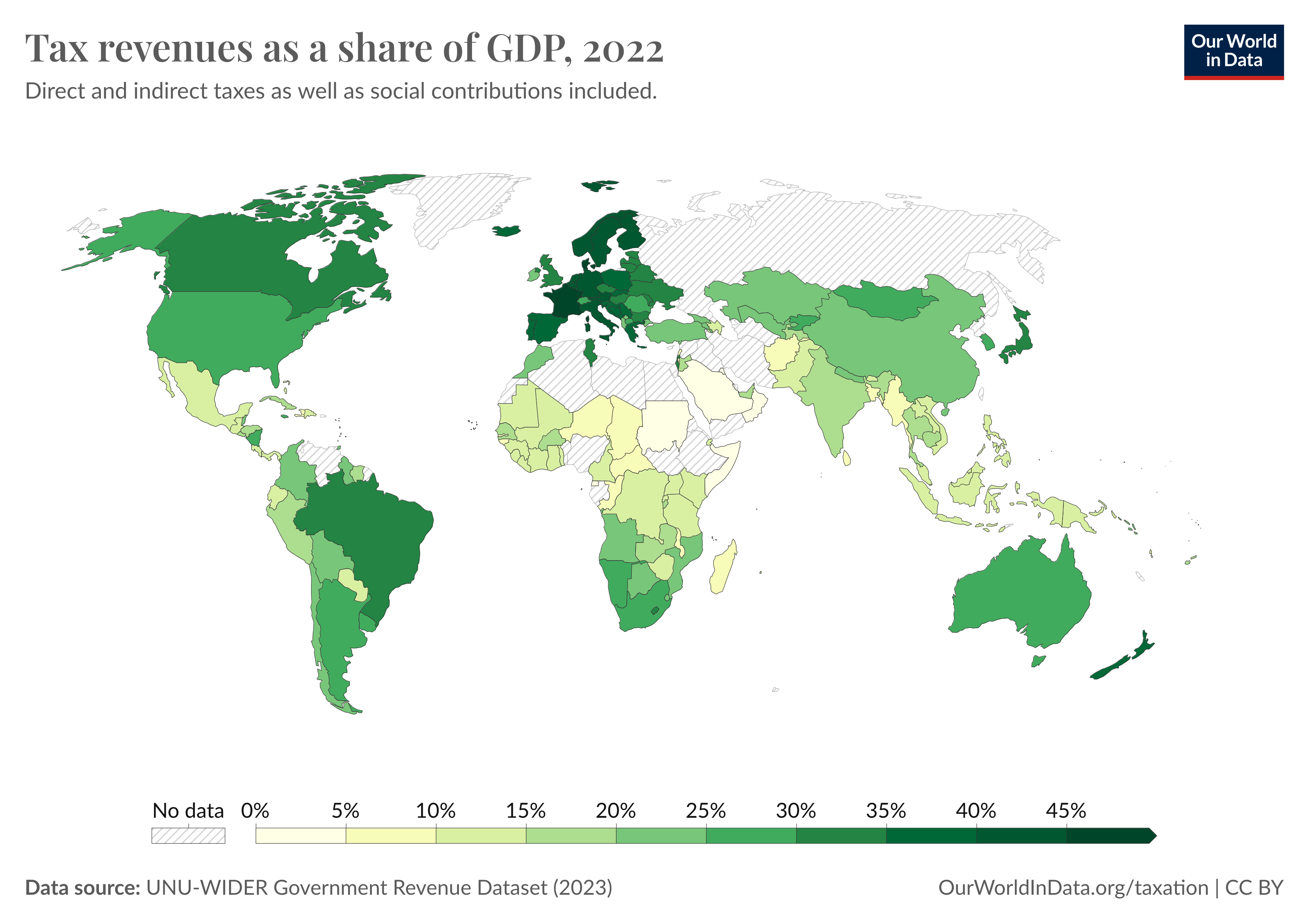
Total revenue from direct and indirect taxes given as share of GDP in 2022

Taxation as a percentage of GDP 2016 was 45.9% in Denmark, 45.3% in France, 33.2% in the United Kingdom, 26% in the United States, and among all OECD members an average of 34.3%.

In terms of modern recognition of human rights such as by the Council of Europe, taxation is widely recognized as part of the "hard core of public authority prerogatives" which signifies that the power to levy taxes is a fundamental, sovereign function of the state (public law) rather than a private transaction.

In the case law of the European Court of Human Rights, following the decision in Ferrazzini, tax matters—including assessments, surcharges, and enforcement—are considered part of the "hard core" because they fall outside the scope of "civil rights and obligations" guaranteed under Article 6(1) of the European Convention on Human Rights.

In the United States, the IRS has about 1,177 forms and instructions, 28.4111 megabytes of Internal Revenue Code which contained 3.8 million words as of 1 February 2010, multiple tax regulations in the Code of Federal Regulations, and supplementary material in the Internal Revenue Bulletin.

=== Development ===
General government revenue, in % of GDP, from social contributions. For this data, 20% of the variance of GDP per capita – adjusted for purchasing power parity (PPP) – is explained by revenue from social security and the like.

Following Nicolas Kaldor's research, public finance in developing countries is strongly tied to state capacity and financial development. As state capacity develops, states not only increase the level of taxation but also the pattern of taxation. With larger tax bases and the diminishing importance of trading tax, income tax gains more importance.

According to Tilly's argument, state capacity evolves as a response to the emergence of war. War is an incentive for states to raise taxes and strengthen states' capacity. Historically, a number of taxation breakthroughs took place during wartime. The introduction of income tax in Britain was due to the Napoleonic War in 1798. The US first introduced income tax during the Civil War. Taxation is constrained by the fiscal and legal capacities of a country. Fiscal and legal capacities also complement each other. A well-designed tax system can minimize efficiency loss and boost economic growth. With better compliance and better support to financial institutions and individual property, the government will be able to collect more tax. Although wealthier countries have higher tax revenue, economic growth does not always translate to higher tax revenue. For example, in India, increases in exemptions lead to the stagnation of income tax revenue at around 0.5% of GDP since 1986.

However, in a quarter of African countries Overseas Development Assistance does exceed tax collection, with these more likely to be non-resource-rich countries. This suggests countries making the most progress replacing aid with tax revenue tend to be those benefiting disproportionately from rising prices of energy and commodities.

In high-income countries, the highest tax-to-GDP ratio is in Denmark at 47% and the lowest is in Kuwait at 0.8%, reflecting low taxes from strong oil revenues. The long-term average performance of tax revenue as a share of GDP in low-income countries has been largely stagnant, although most have shown some improvement in more recent years. On average, resource-rich countries have made the most progress, rising from 10% in the mid-1990s to around 17% in 2008. Non-resource-rich countries made some progress, with average tax revenues increasing from 10% to 15% over the same period.

Many low-income countries have a tax-to-GDP ratio of less than 15% which could be due to low tax potentials, such as a limited taxable economic activity, or low tax effort due to policy choice, non-compliance, or administrative constraints.

Some low-income countries have relatively high tax-to-GDP ratios due to resource tax revenues (e.g. Angola) or relatively efficient tax administration (e.g. Kenya, Brazil) whereas some middle-income countries have lower tax-to-GDP ratios (e.g. Malaysia) which reflect a more tax-friendly policy choice.

While overall tax revenues have remained broadly constant, the global trend shows trade taxes have been declining as a proportion of total revenues (IMF, 2011), with the share of revenue shifting away from border trade taxes towards domestically levied sales taxes on goods and services. Low-income countries tend to have a higher dependence on trade taxes, and a smaller proportion of income and consumption taxes when compared to high-income countries.

One indicator of the taxpaying experience was captured in the "Doing Business" survey, which compares the total tax rate, time spent complying with tax procedures, and the number of payments required through the year, across 176 countries. The "easiest" countries in which to pay taxes are located in the Middle East with the UAE ranking first, followed by Qatar and Saudi Arabia, most likely reflecting low tax regimes in those countries. Countries in Sub-Saharan Africa are among the "hardest" to pay with the Central African Republic, Republic of Congo, Guinea and Chad in the bottom 5, reflecting higher total tax rates and a greater administrative burden to comply.

=== Public support ===
A 2017 systematic review found public support for taxes is conditional on the goal of the taxes. Taxation is a highly debated topic by some, as although taxation is deemed necessary by a supermajority for society to function and grow in an orderly and equitable manner through the government provision of public goods and public services, others such as libertarians are anti-taxation and denounce taxation broadly or in its entirety, classifying taxation as theft or extortion through coercion along with the use of force. A majority of U.S. voters consider taxes unfair and few say they receive good value for the taxes they pay.

=== Geoism ===
Geoists (Georgists and geolibertarians) state that taxation should primarily collect economic rent, in particular the value of land, for both reasons of economic efficiency as well as morality. The efficiency of using economic rent for taxation is (as economists agree) due to the fact that such taxation cannot be passed on and does not create any dead-weight loss, and that it removes the incentive to speculate on land. Its morality is based on the Geoist premise that private property is justified for products of labor but not for land and natural resources.

Economist and social reformer Henry George opposed sales taxes and protective tariffs for their negative impact on trade. He also believed in the right of each person to the fruits of their own labor and productive investment. Therefore, income from paid labor and proper capital should remain untaxed. For this reason multiple Geoists—in particular those that call themselves geolibertarian—share the view with libertarians that these types of taxation (but not all) are immoral and even theft. George stated there should be one single tax: the Land Value Tax, which is considered both efficient and moral. Demand for specific land is dependent on nature, but even more so on the presence of communities, trade, and government infrastructure, particularly in urban environments. Therefore, the economic rent of land is not the product of one particular individual and it may be claimed for public expenses. According to George, this would end real estate bubbles, business cycles, unemployment and distribute wealth much more evenly. Joseph Stiglitz's Henry George Theorem predicts its sufficiency for financing public goods because those raise land value.

This means that while Geoists also regard taxation as an instrument of social justice, contrary to social democrats and social liberals they do not regard it as an instrument of redistribution but rather a 'predistribution' or simply a correct distribution of the commons.

Modern geoists note that land in the classical economic meaning of the word referred to all natural resources, and thus also includes resources such as mineral deposits, water bodies and the electromagnetic spectrum, to which privileged access also generates economic rent that must be compensated. Under the same reasoning most of them also consider pigouvian taxes as compensation for environmental damage or privilege as acceptable and even necessary.

== Philosophy ==
Every tax, however, is, to the person who pays it, a badge, not of slavery, but of liberty. – Adam Smith (1776), Wealth of Nations

Taxation in modern nation-states benefit the majority of the population and social development. Whereas economic theories of taxation aim to maximise social welfare, philosophers and political scholars of tax consider a number of factors, including justice, morality, and human rights.

=== Democracy and government ===
In a democracy, because the government is the party performing the act of imposing taxes, society as a whole decides how the tax system should be organized. Social democrats generally favor higher levels of taxation to fund public provision of a wide range of services such as universal health care and education, as well as the provision of a range of welfare benefits. Direct democracy was found to lead to lower tax rates in some cases.

Oliver Wendell Holmes Jr. has stated that "Taxes are the price of civilization".

John Locke stated that whenever labor is mixed with natural resources, such as is the case with improved land, private property is justified under the proviso that there must be enough other natural resources of the same quality available to others.

==== Tax choice ====
Tax choice is the theory that taxpayers should have more control with how their individual taxes are allocated. If taxpayers could choose which government organizations received their taxes, opportunity cost decisions would integrate their partial knowledge. For example, a taxpayer who allocated more of his taxes on public education would have less to allocate on public healthcare. Supporters argue that allowing taxpayers to demonstrate their preferences would help ensure that the government succeeds at efficiently producing the public goods that taxpayers truly value. This would end real estate speculation, business cycles, unemployment and distribute wealth much more evenly. Joseph Stiglitz's Henry George Theorem predicts its sufficiency because—as George also noted—public spending raises land value.

=== Liberty ===
==== American libertarianism ====
The popular American slogan "No taxation without representation" became popular during the American Revolution.

American libertarians recommend a minimal level of taxation in order to maximize the protection of liberty.

Because payment of tax is compulsory and enforced by the legal system, rather than voluntary like crowdfunding, some political philosophies view taxation as theft, extortion, slavery, as a violation of property rights, or tyranny, accusing the government of levying taxes via force and coercive means. Objectivists, anarcho-capitalists, and American libertarians see taxation as government aggression through the lens of the non-aggression principle. The view that democracy legitimizes taxation is rejected by those who argue that the right to property is inalienable, and consequently cannot be abridged by the government. According to Ludwig von Mises, "society as a whole" should not make such decisions, due to methodological individualism. Some libertarian opponents of taxation claim that governmental protection, such as police and defense forces, might be replaced by market alternatives such as private defense agencies, arbitration agencies or voluntary contributions.

Murray Rothbard argued in The Ethics of Liberty in 1982 that taxation is theft and that tax resistance is therefore legitimate: "Just as no one is morally required to answer a robber truthfully when he asks if there are any valuables in one's house, so no one can be morally required to answer truthfully similar questions asked by the state, e.g., when filling out income tax returns."

=== Socialism ===
Karl Marx assumed that taxation would be unnecessary after the advent of communism and looked forward to the "withering away of the state". In socialist economies such as that of China, taxation played a minor role, since most government income was derived from the ownership of enterprises, and it was argued by some that monetary taxation was not necessary.

=== Jurisprudence ===
Concerning international law, legal scholars consider "the fundamental question of what degree of taxation, if any, rises to the level of confiscation or expropriation" as unresolved, but take into account such factors as "the taxpayers ability to pay, the principle of proportionality and whether the tax essentially eats the income from the burdened economic activity."

== Theory ==
=== Laffer curve ===
One potential result of the Laffer curve is that increasing tax rates beyond a certain point will become counterproductive for raising further tax revenue. A hypothetical Laffer curve for any given economy can only be estimated and such estimates are sometimes controversial. The New Palgrave Dictionary of Economics reports that estimates of revenue-maximizing tax rates have varied widely, with a mid-range of around 70%.

=== Optimal ===
Most governments take revenue that exceeds that which can be provided by non-distortionary taxes or through taxes that give a double dividend. Optimal taxation theory is the branch of economics that considers how taxes can be structured to give the least deadweight costs, or to give the best outcomes in terms of social welfare. The Ramsey problem deals with minimizing deadweight costs. Because deadweight costs are related to the elasticity of supply and demand for a good, it follows that putting the highest tax rates on the goods for which there are most inelastic supply and demand will result in the least overall deadweight costs. Some economists sought to integrate optimal tax theory with the social welfare function, which is the economic expression of the idea that equality is valuable to a greater or lesser extent. If individuals experience diminishing returns from income, then the optimum distribution of income for society involves a progressive income tax. Mirrlees optimal income tax is a detailed theoretical model of the optimum progressive income tax along these lines. Over the last years the validity of the theory of optimal taxation was discussed by multiple political economists.

In a 2025 Gallup poll in the United States more citizens consider their taxes as too high compared to too low.

== See also ==
- Advance tax ruling
- Black market
- DIRTI 5
- Excess burden of taxation
- Fiscal capacity
- Fiscal incidence
- Fiscal sociology
- Government budget balance
- International taxation
- List of taxes
- Price ceiling
- Price floor
- Revolutionary tax
- Tax competition
- Tax exporting
- Tax haven
- Tax resistance
- Tax revenue
- Tax shelter
- Taxpayer receipt

=== By country or region ===
- List of countries by tax rates
- List of countries by tax revenue
- Revenue service
- Category:Taxation by country
