= Freimut =

Freimut (German for "frankness", lit. 'open courage') is both a German masculine given name and a surname. Notable people with the name include:

== Given name ==
- Freimut Börngen (1930–2021), German astronomer and discoverer of minor planets
- Freimut Duve (1936–2020), German journalist, writer, politician and human rights activist
- Freimut Stein (1924–1986), German figure skater

== Surname ==
- Maciej Freimut (born 1967), Polish sprint canoeist
- Olha Freimut (born 1982), Ukrainian TV presenter, journalist, writer and model

== See also ==
- Freimuth, a German surname, variant of Freimut
