= Fiscal sociology =

Sociology of public finance

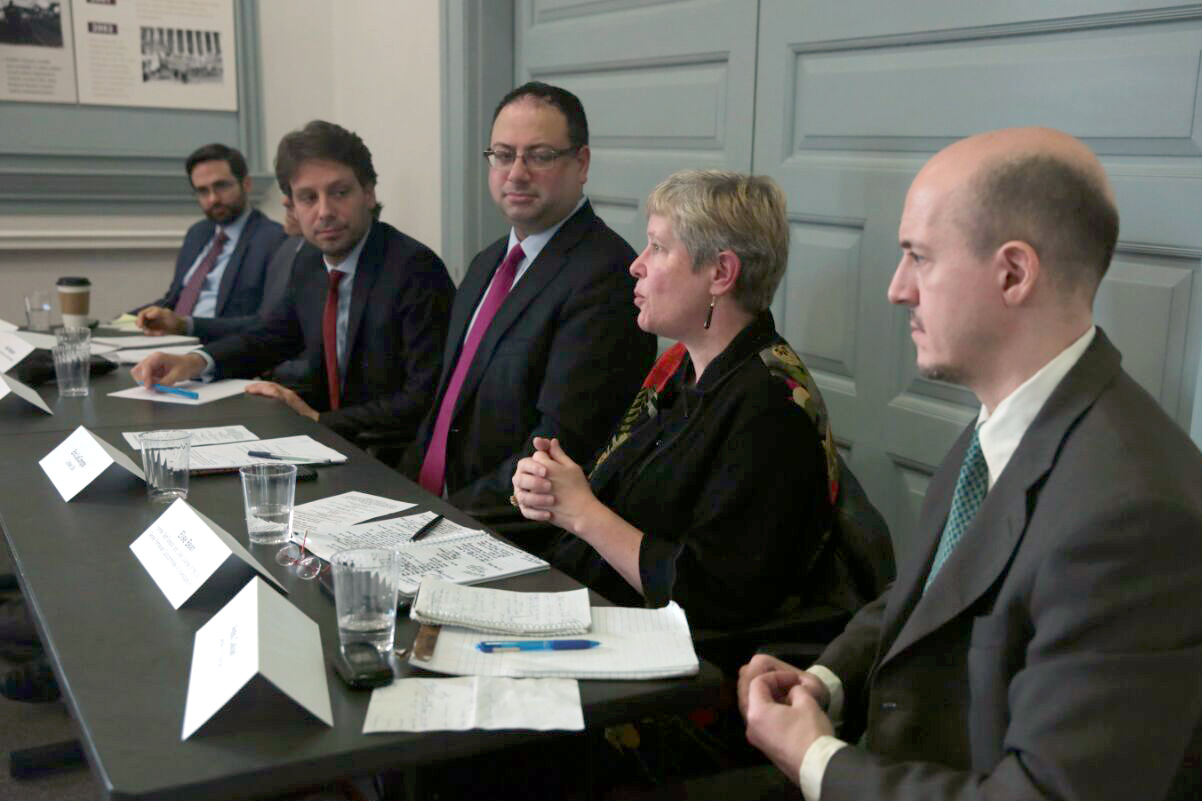
Elise Bean talks as Guillaume Long, former Ecuadorian politician who served as the Minister of Foreign Affairs of Ecuador and Human Mobility, and others look on.

Fiscal sociology is the sociology of public finance, particularly tax policy. As a field, it seeks to explore the relationship that taxation constitutes between citizens and the state, including the cultural and historical factors that determine compliance with taxation. Joseph Schumpeter's 1918 work "The Crisis of the Tax State" is a founding text of fiscal sociology, though Schumpeter himself borrowed the term from the Austrian sociologist Rudolf Goldscheid's 1917 Staatssozialismus oder Staatskapitalismus ("State Socialism or State Capitalism"). Since the 1990s, "new fiscal sociology" has analysed the foundational role of taxation as a cause, and not just an effect, of the emergence of modernity.
