= Rudolf Goldscheid =

Austrian sociologist (1870–1931)

Rudolf Goldscheid (12 August 1870 – 6 October 1931) was an Austrian writer and sociologist, co-founder of the German Sociological Association, known for his theory of human economy (German: Menschenökonomie) and for developing the topic of fiscal sociology. He has been described as "the founder of scientific sociology in Vienna", though he never had a job with a university.

== Life ==
Rudolf Goldscheid was born in Vienna on 12 August 1870 as the fifth child of a Jewish family of merchants. After graduating from a Viennese secondary school, in 1891 he enrolled at Friedrich Wilhelm University in Berlin to study philosophy and sociology, but quit without a degree in 1894. He remained in Germany for some years, writing novels and plays using the pseudonym Rudolf Golm, and married Marie Rudolph in Leipzig in 1898, returning to Vienna soon afterwards. Politically, Goldscheid was a pacifist and social democrat, a member of the Social Democratic Party of Austria and contributor to the socialist newspaper Arbeiter-Zeitung. He endorsed philosophical monism, and his scepticism of traditional religious beliefs caused him to abandon Judaism during 1921. He died in Vienna on 6 October 1931. His funeral was attended by the city's socialist mayor Karl Seitz, and the municipal council soon afterwards named a street in his honour.

== Theories ==
In contrast to social Darwinism and Malthusianism, Goldscheid's theory of the human economy emphasised the idea of humans as a type of "organic capital" within a broader "developmental economy". A healthy economy would protect and promote the rights and welfare of all workers: to ignore "the direct and in particular the indirect costs" of phenomena such as lack of education, child labour, the exhaustion of workers and the spread of diseases among the labour force, was to "indulge in a fiction of productivity". Goldscheid adopted a neo-Lamarckian philosophy concerning inheritance of acquired characteristics, arguing that negative environments could damage human capabilities lastingly: what was needed, he argued, was a social environment that would foster human Höherentwicklung, "upward development" or "evolution". Goldscheid's concept of organic capital was a precedent for later theories of human capital.

He was early proponent of an expressly socialist eugenics in Germany.

Goldscheid also developed the idea that a sociology of the state must emphasize understanding public finance. His 1917 book Staatssozialismus oder Staatskapitalismus ("State Socialism or State Capitalism") invented the term Finanzsoziologie, fiscal or financial sociology, arguing that the "budget is the skeleton of the state stripped of all misleading ideologies". Goldscheid's idea of fiscal sociology influenced the economist Joseph Schumpeter's description of the "tax state". Schumpeter and Goldscheid had opposing opinions of the role of public debt, however: after World War I, while Schumpeter argued that Austria needed to work to extinguish its debt burden, Goldscheid drew on the cameralist tradition to endorse the recapitalisation of the debt, in order to allow the state to assume a more active and entrepreneurial role.
