= Paul J. J. Welfens =

German economist (1957–2022)

Paul J.J. Welfens (29 January 1957 – 11 November 2022) was a German economist.

He was born in Düren, West Germany and studied economics in Wuppertal, Duisburg and Paris. He obtained his PhD in 1985 and his full professorship in 1989, after which he became professor at the Wilhelms University of Münster and the University of Potsdam.

From 2004, Welfens was the chair professor for economics with a focus on macroeconomic theory and policy at the Bergisch University of Wuppertal, and the Jean Monnet professor for European Economic Integration. In 2007 he took a visiting professorship at the Institut d'Etudes Politiques de Paris (Paris Institute of Political Studies). In the same year he was the first German to be awarded the silver medal of the International N. D. Kondratiev Foundation.

Welfens was founder and president of the European Institute for International Economic Relations (EIIW) at the University of Wuppertal, which is a non-partisan, non-profit research institute looking at issues such as globalization and multinational companies, banking developments and capital markets, ICT and digitalization, trade, economic integration amongst others. He has published books and journal papers on many pressing contemporary issues concerning economic integration and the world economy, including on Brexit, structural populism in the US under President Trump and the impact on US-EU-China/Asia relations, and most recently on the macroeconomic and health system effects of the coronavirus pandemic.

== Selected publications ==
Welfens has published over 160 works and academic papers.

- European Monetary Integration, Springer, February 1994
- Grundlagen der Wirtschaftspolitik (Springer-Lehrbuch), Springer Verlag, Mai 1995 Paperback
- Grundlagen der Wirtschaftspolitik von Paul J.J. Welfens
- Internationalization of the Economy and Environmental Policy Options, Springer, September 2001 Hardcover
- European Monetary Union, Springer, Oktober 1997 Hardcover
- Stabilizing and Integrating the Balkans, Springer, Mai 2001 Hardcover
- Globalization of the Economy, Unemployment and Innovation, Springer, August 1999 Hardcover
- Globalization, economic growth and innovation dynamics, Springer, 1999
- Structural change and exchange rate dynamics Springer, 2005
- Integration in Asia and Europe, Springer, 2006
- Innovations in Macroeconomics, Springer, 2008
- Digital integration, growth and rational regulation, Springer, 2008
- Brexit aus Versehen: Europäsiche Union zwischen Desintegration und neuer EU, Springer, 2017
- An Accidental BREXIT, Palgrave Macmillan, 2017
- The Global Trump: Structural US Populism and Economic Conflicts with Europe and Asia, Palgrave Macmillan, 2019
- Klimaschutzpolitik - Das Ende der Komfortzone: Neue wirtschaftliche und internationale Perspektiven zur Klimadebatte, Springer, 2019
- Russia's Invasion of Ukraine: Economic Challenges, Embargo Issues and A New Global Economic Order, Palgrave Macmillan 2023
