= Redvers Opie =

British economist

- Born: 1900
- Died: 10 February 1984; Mexico

Academic background
- Education: Harvard University

Academic work
- Institutions: Magdalen College, University of Oxford
- Notable ideas: The Theory of Economic Development: An Inquiry into Profits, Capital, Credit, Interest, and the Business Cycle

Redvers Opie (1900–1984) was a British economist. On the recommendation of John Maynard Keynes, he became the United Kingdom Treasury representative in Washington, D.C., as Counsellor and economic adviser at the British Embassy, 1939–46, and was one of the five members of the UK delegation to the Bretton Woods Conference, which gave birth to the International Monetary Fund and the World Bank.

== Life ==
Opie married a daughter of the American economist F. W. Taussig. Opie was educated at Durham University, he taught at Oxford University where he eventually became the Bursar of Magdalen College. He later went on to do a doctorate at Harvard University, where he became a member of the teaching staff.

Among many books, Opie is perhaps most famous for his translation of The Theory of Economic Development: An Inquiry into Profits, Capital, Credit, Interest, and the Business Cycle (part of the Harvard Economic Studies series) by Joseph A. Schumpeter.

He moved to Mexico, becoming a naturalized Mexican, where he founded Ecanal in 1976. Ecanal is currently a source of critical analysis of economic and government policy useful for business. Redvers died on February 10, 1984. The sole remaining partner of Ecanal is now Rogelio Ramirez de la O.

== Selected bibliography ==
=== Books ===
- Opie, Redvers (translator); Schumpeter, Joseph A. (author) (1983) [1934]. The theory of economic development: an inquiry into profits, capital, credit, interest, and the business cycle. New Brunswick, New Jersey: Transaction Books. ISBN 9780878556984. Hardback ISBN 9780674879904. Translated from the 1911 original German, Theorie der wirtschaftlichen Entwicklung.
- Opie, Redvers; Brown, Jr., William Adams (1953). American foreign assistance. Washington, D.C.: The Brookings Institution. OCLC 171554.

=== Journal articles ===
- Opie, Redvers (July 1984). "Cambridge Marxists in Mexico". Economic Affairs. 4 (4): 52–53. doi:10.1111/j.1468-0270.1984.tb01657.x.
- Opie, Redvers (June 1931). "Marshall's time analysis". The Economic Journal. 41 (162): 199–215. doi:10.2307/2223698. JSTOR 2223698.
