= Taxpayer receipt =

A taxpayer receipt is a proposed receipt given by government to taxpayers that would show the breakdown of the citizen's tax paid for areas such as social security, the military, education, veterans' benefits and health care. In many countries the data for tax division is publicly available, so the amount of taxes one has paid can be calculated by any taxpayer. Thus, regardless of whether countries implement taxpayer receipt, the same information is available, so some question whether the breakdown should be made available to citizens that are not prepared to calculate it themselves.

Research has found that taxpayer receipts may reduce political polarization with respect to taxation and government spending.

The 113th congress of the United States passed the Taxpayer's Receipt bill in August 2012. The aim of the bill was to resolve taxpayer concerns about the use of their money. Information in the bill gives exact details of the Taxpayer Receipt. The proposed bill is in the public domain and available on the web.
