= Lambert T. Koch =

German economist and university professor

Lambert T. Koch is a German economist and university professor who has published extensively. Since 2008, Koch has served as rector (head) of the University of Wuppertal.

== Life ==
Lambert Tobias Koch was born during the tail end of the "Wirtschaftswunder" years at Hering, a small town in the hills east of Darmstadt. His father was a Catholic Theology professor and, for more than twenty years, head of the Cathedral School at Würzburg. Koch spent his childhood in Würzburg.

After completing his school education at the "Tilmann-Riemenschneider-Gymnasium" (secondary school), Koch spent one year serving in the army, becoming a reserve officer. Moving on to university, he studied Economics at -Mainz and Würzburg. Having completed his first degree he remained at Würzburg to start work on his doctorate. In 1990, reunification opened up new possibilities for young people from both sides of what had become, since 1961, an increasingly impermeable border between two versions of Germany: Koch was able to transfer to the University of Jena where he completed both his doctorate and his habilitation, opening the way to a career in the universities sector.

In 1899, Koch accepted a teaching chair in Economics with a particular focus on development and business start-ups at the University of Wuppertal. He remained in the post till 2008. He held a parallel post as director (head) of the university's "Institute for Start-up and Innovation Research". He accepted guest professorships at Cleveland (Ohio), Klagenfurt (Carinthia) and Košice (Slovakia). The second and third of these have involved regular visits. Between October 2005 and June 2008 Koch also served as Dean of the Economics Faculty.Wuppertal. (The Economics Faculty has subsequently been rebranded as the "Schumpeter School of Business and Economics".)

On 1 September 2008, Koch was installed as University Rector) at Wuppertal in succession to the sociologist-jurist Volker Ronge.
