= Jürgen Gerlach (engineer) =

German university lecturer (born 1963)

Jürgen Gerlach (born 11 July 1963 in Iserlohn) is a German engineer and urban planner. As university professor at Bergische Universität Wuppertal he is head of the department for traffic planning and road traffic engineering in the faculty of architecture and construction engineering. He is member of standard setting bodies of the German professional association for roads and traffic (FGSV). From 2016 to 2020 he was heard as an expert in the court proceedings of the Love Parade disaster.
