= University Library of Wuppertal =

University library in Wuppertal, Germany

University Library Wuppertal
- Universitätsbibliothek Wuppertal

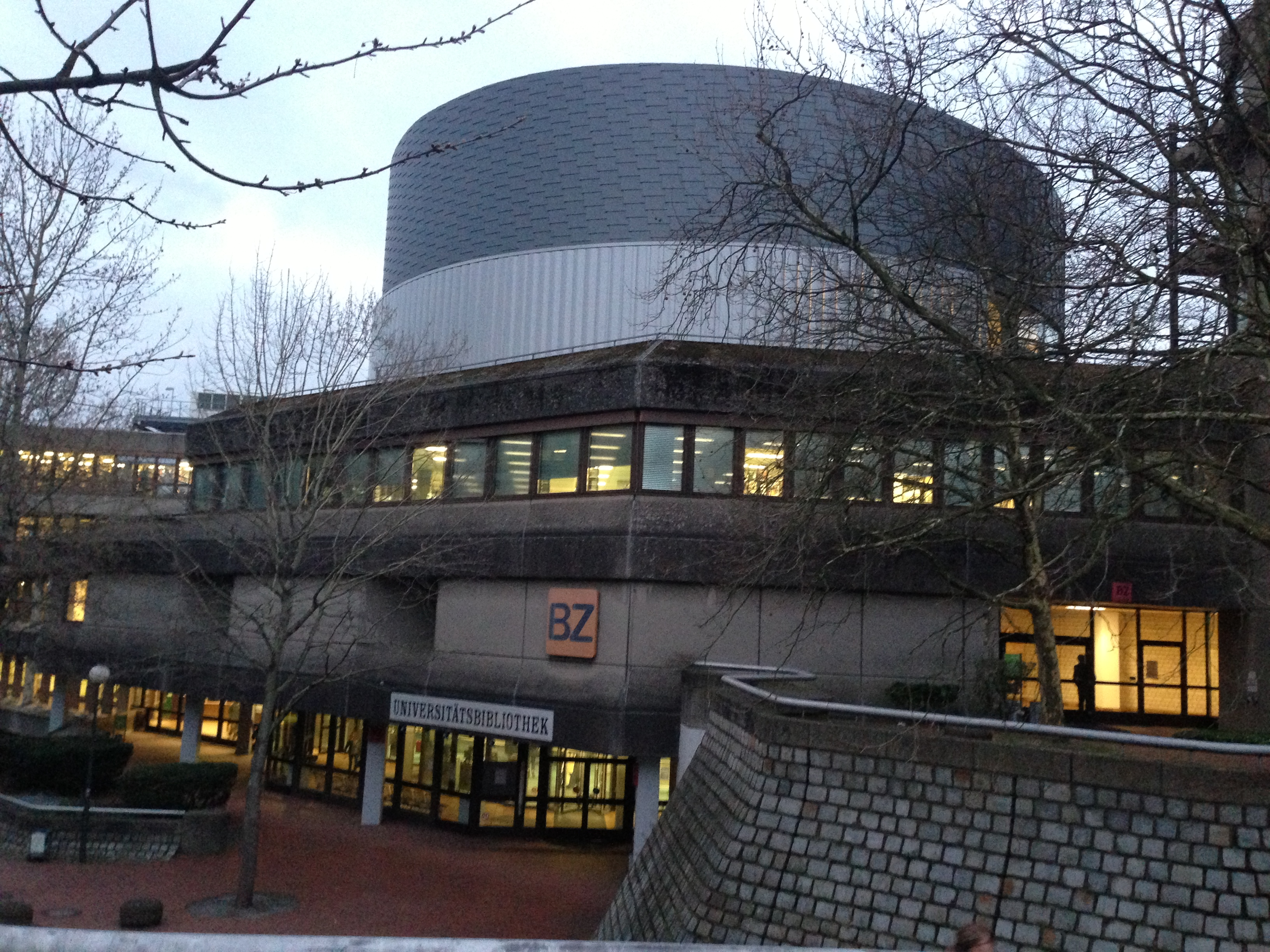
- 51°14′44.5″N 7°8′55″E
- Location: Wuppertal, Germany
- Established: 1972

Collection
- Size: 1.2 million items (2013)

Other information
- Website: www.bib.uni-wuppertal.de

The University Library of Wuppertal (German: Universitätsbibliothek Wuppertal, abbreviated UBW) is a central service institution of University of Wuppertal in Wuppertal, Germany. The main building at main campus Grifflenberg holds five special libraries while both sub campuses Haspel and Freudenberg hold one special library each.

About 16,000 people use the library on a regular basis and borrow about 1.9 million books per year.

== History ==
The library was founded in 1972, the same year the university was founded. It united the former libraries of Pedagogic College Rhineland and College of Wuppertal. In March 2012 a new reading room was opened and included 200 new study desks, a range of internet stations and three lockable rotundas with working stations for groups. The whole room was part of the 2013 Day of Architecture in North Rhine-Westphalia. In December 2013 the library received a large private donation from the family of Mario Puelma that involved thousands of books.

== Stock ==
The University Library of Wuppertal holds:

- more than 1.2 million books,
- more than 2,300 magazine subscriptions,
- more than 20,100 e-journals.

About 3,000 books are part of the historical stock; so for example the oldest book the library holds is dated back to 1490. The library receives about 20,000 new items per year.

=== Collections ===
The library holds significant private collections of the two philologists Günther Jachmann and Mario Puelma.
