= Richard Swedberg =

Swedish sociologist

Academic background
- Education: Boston College

Academic work
- Main interests: Sociologist
- Notable ideas: Social theory and economic sociology

Richard Swedberg (born 18 May 1948) is a Swedish sociologist. He is currently professor emeritus at the Department of Sociology at Cornell University. In the Fall of 1998, Swedberg was a Fellow at the Swedish Collegium for Advanced Study in Uppsala, Sweden.

== Education ==
He received a PhD in sociology from Boston College (1978); he also holds a law degree ("juris kandidat") from Stockholm University (1970).

== Research ==
Swedberg's two specialties are social theory and economic sociology. The focus in his work on social theory is currently on theorizing or how to learn to theorize.

== Publications ==
So far he has produced a monograph on theory, with practical instructions for how to theorize (The Art of Social Theory, Princeton University Press, 2014) and an anthology (Theorizing in the Social Sciences: The Context of Discovery, Stanford University Press, 2014). Swedberg is also the co-author, together with Peter Hedstrom, of Social Mechanisms (1998, Cambridge University Press).

As to economic sociology, he has been a contributor to this field since its renewal in the mid-1980s ("new economic sociology"). Swedberg has written extensively on the works by Max Weber and Joseph Schumpeter and is currently working on the financial crisis. He is the author of e.g. Economics and Sociology (1990; Princeton University Press), Max Weber and the Idea of Economic Sociology (1998, Princeton University Press) and Tocqueville's Political Economy (2009, Princeton University Press). Swedberg, with Trevor Pinch, also wrote Living In a Material World (2008, MIT Press), a volume on the intersections between economic sociology and science and technology studies, part of the Inside Technology series.

His edited work includes The Economics and Sociology of Capitalism, Handbook of Economic Sociology (with Neil Smelser) (1994, 2005, Russell Sage Foundation & Princeton University Press) and Sociology of Economic Life (with Mark Granovetter (1992, 2001, 2011, Westview).

His vitae as well as some of his writings are available at his webpage at Cornell University.

== Honours ==
On 29 January 2016 Swedberg received an honorary doctorate from the Faculty of Social Sciences at Uppsala University for his insights in "how useful the work of classical thinkers can be in understanding contemporary society".
