= University of Wuppertal =

University in Wuppertal, Germany

- Bergische Universität Wuppertal
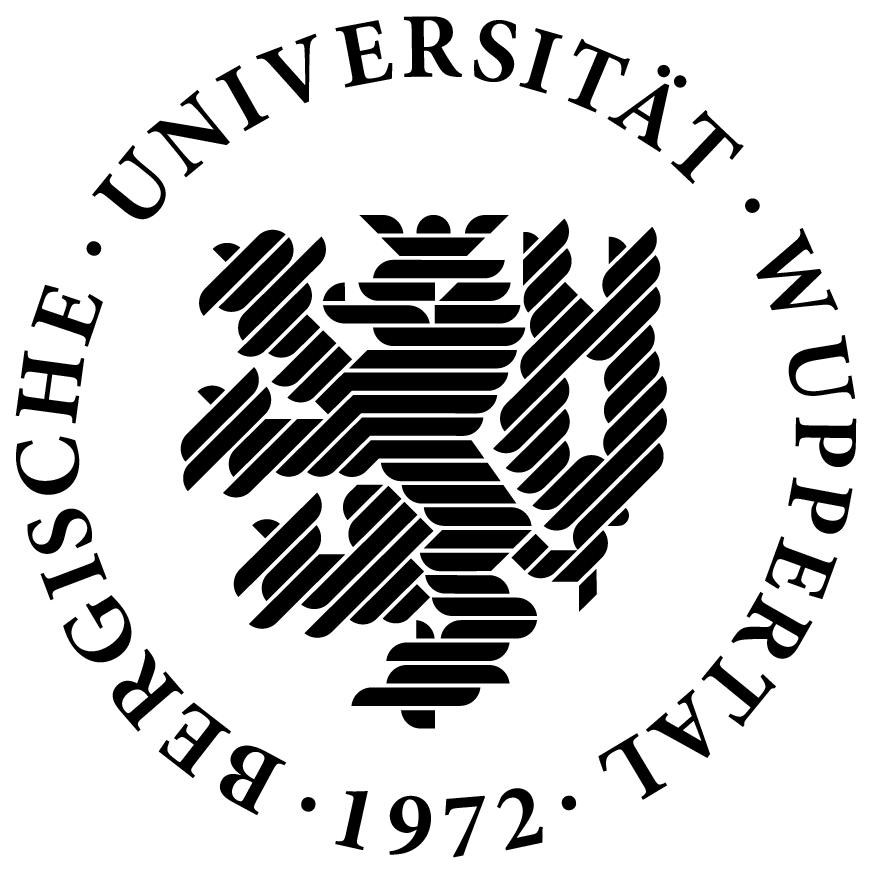
- Seal of the University of Wuppertal
- Type: Public
- Established: 1972
- Budget: € 189.4 million
- Rector: Birgitta Wolff
- Academic staff: 992
- Administrative staff: 581
- Students: 20,957
- Undergraduates: 15,072
- Postgraduates: 4,703
- Doctoral students: 957
- Location: Wuppertal, North Rhine-Westphalia, Germany; 51°14′43″N 7°08′58″E
- Campus: Urban
- Website: www.uni-wuppertal.de

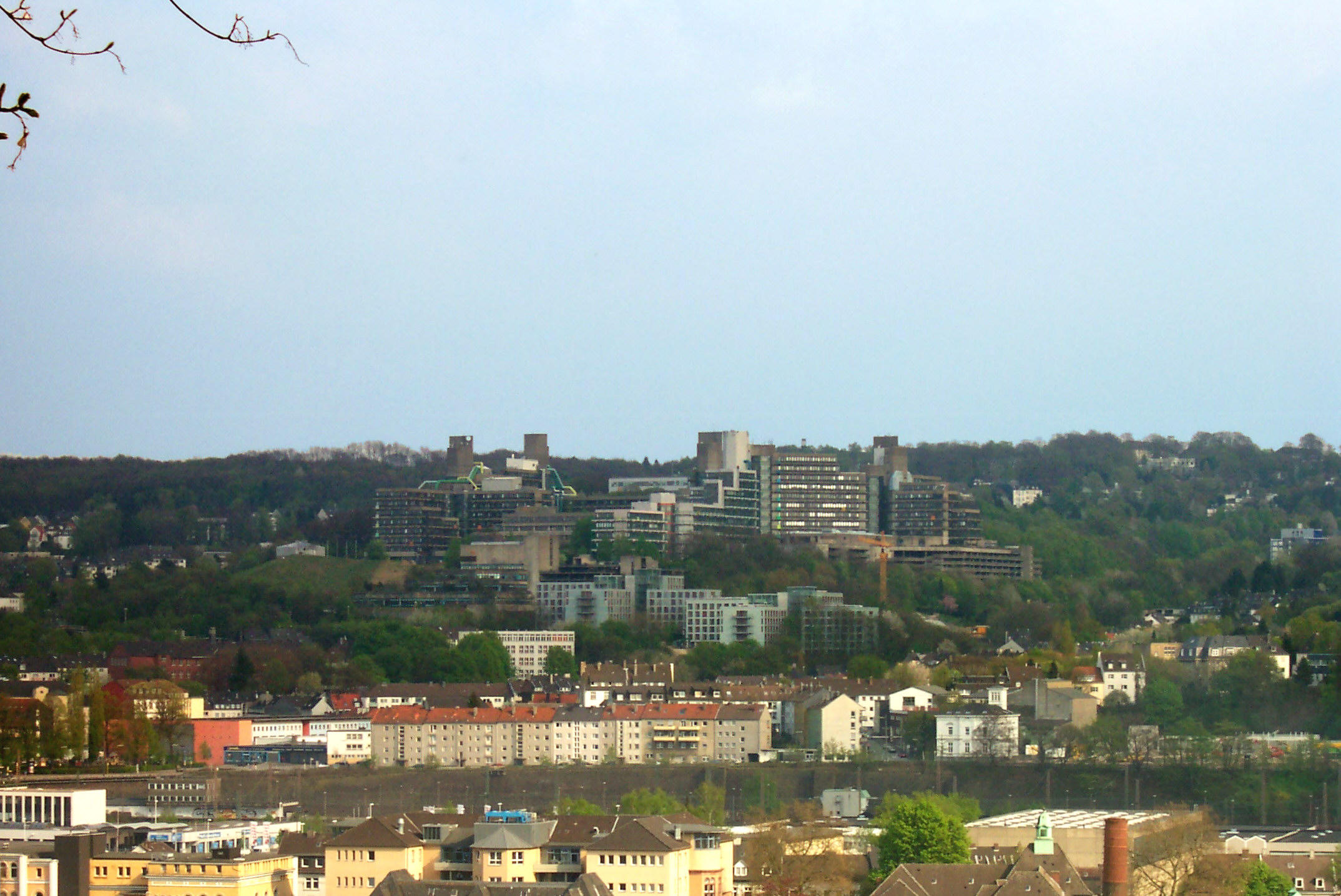
Campus Grifflenberg, University of Wuppertal

The University of Wuppertal (Universität Wuppertal) is a German scientific institution located in Wuppertal in the state of North Rhine-Westphalia, Germany.

The university's official name in German is Bergische Universität Wuppertal or BUW, founded in 1972. Around 2014 to 2015, approximately 20,000 students were enrolled in a wide range of subjects with many interdisciplinary linkages between a total of seven faculties.

== History ==
The University of Wuppertal (Bergische Universität Wuppertal) was established in 1972 as part of a state initiative to consolidate several regional educational institutions. These included engineering, industrial arts, and teacher-training schools in Wuppertal and its surroundings. The university commenced operations in the winter semester of 1972/73, initially serving approximately 3,500 students.

Following its foundation, the university expanded both its physical and academic infrastructure. In 1977, the main campus at Grifflenberg was opened, with the official inauguration ceremony taking place on 24 October that year. By 1978, enrolment had grown to around 7,000 students, and the institution became a member of the German Research Foundation (DFG).

In 2003, the university adopted its current name, Bergische Universität Wuppertal, fully transitioning from the "Gesamthochschule" model and expanding its academic offerings. As of 2024/25, the university enrolls over 21,000 students and offers more than 80 programs across three campuses.

== Organization ==
- Faculty 1: humanities and cultural studies
- Faculty 2: human and social sciences
- Faculty 3: Schumpeter School of Business and Economics
- Faculty 4: mathematics and natural sciences
- Faculty 5: architecture, civil engineering, mechanical engineering, safety
- Faculty 6: electrical engineering, information technology, media technology
- Faculty 7: mechanical engineering and safety engineering
- Faculty 8: design and art
- School of Education: Institute for Educational Research (IfB)

== Campus ==
The main building of the University of Wuppertal is located in the suburb of Elberfeld on the Grifflenberg. The university now has three campuses:

- Campus Grifflenberg (main campus) in Elberfeld, Wuppertal
- Campus Freudenberg in Elberfeld, Wuppertal
- Campus Haspel in Unterbarmen, Wuppertal

All three campuses house specific parts of the University Library of Wuppertal; the main library at Campus Grifflenberg holds five specific libraries.

From 2004 until 2010, the University of Wuppertal was home to the second supercomputer at a German university. ALiCEnext, the supercomputer, was designed as a cluster and consisted of 512 so-called Blades. ALiCEnext was used in the field of elementary particle physics, applied computer science, astro-particle physics and experimental high energy physics.

== Study ==
The University of Wuppertal (Bergische Universität Wuppertal) provides degree programs in accordance with the structure of the German higher education system. Academic instruction is organized across multiple faculties.

=== Undergraduate (Bachelor's) ===
- Bachelor's programs (B.A., B.Sc., B.Eng., B.Ed.) are offered in subject areas including humanities and cultural studies, business and economics, mathematics and natural sciences, architecture, engineering, design, and educational sciences.
- Selected undergraduate programs are taught in English, such as Sustainable Chemistry, Computer Simulation in Science, Applied Economics and International Economic Policy, and Smart Materials and Systems. Language support is provided through the university's Language Learning Institute.
- The standard duration of a bachelor's degree is six semesters (180 ECTS credits).

=== Graduate (Master's) ===
- Master's programs (M.A., M.Sc., M.Ed.) are available in corresponding fields and require a completed undergraduate degree for admission.
- English-taught master's programs include Computer Simulation in Science, Applied Economics, and Smart Materials and Systems.
- Most master's programs have a standard duration of four semesters and require 60–120 ECTS credits for completion.

=== Postgraduate (Doctoral and Postgraduate Certificates) ===
- The university confers doctoral degrees (Dr. phil., Dr.-Ing., among others) in subjects such as engineering, social sciences, and the humanities. Doctoral supervision is carried out within individual faculties or institutes.
- Additional postgraduate options include continuing education certificates in specific interdisciplinary areas such as safety engineering or media studies.

=== Admission and Language Requirements ===
- Entry into undergraduate and graduate programs requires a recognized university entrance qualification. Some programs include additional assessments.
- German-language proficiency is required for most degree programs. English-language programs require proof of English proficiency through standardised tests such as IELTS or TOEFL.

== Notable professors ==
The university employs more than 250 professors (as of 2014). Notable people who have taught in Wuppertal are:

- Bazon Brock, art theorist
- Gerd Faltings, mathematician
- Jürgen Gerlach, transport planner
- Klaus Held, philosopher and founder of the philosophical seminar
- Lev Kopelev, writer and historian of literature
- Karl-Heinz Petzinka, architect
- Dieter Vieweger, archaeologist
- Paul J. J. Welfens, economist

== Notable alumni ==
- Christian Boros (born 1964), German advertising agency founder and art collector
- Godela Habel, abstract painter
- Walter Heidenfels, industrial designer

== Awards and rankings ==
=== Rankings ===
University rankings

Overall – Global & National
THE World 2024	501–600	42–45
ARWU World 2023	801–900	43–45

According to the 2024 Times Higher Education World University Rankings, the institution falls within the 501–600 range globally, placing it between 42nd and 45th nationally. The 2023 Academic Ranking of World Universities (ARWU) situates the university in the 801–900 bracket on a global scale corresponding to a national rank between 43rd and 45th.

In 2016, CWUR ranked the University of Wuppertal as the 909th best university overall within its list of top 1000 international universities. In 2017, its place rose to 844th in the same list.

=== National rankings ===
At the CHE ranking which evaluated more than 300 universities in the German-speaking world on the basis of the judgments of more than 250,000 students, the University of Wuppertal was awarded three times. In 2011, the university reached the top group in eleven of the 13 categories. With a total score of 1.9, the Faculty of Economics was above the nationwide average of 2.6.
