= Eluoma =

Town in Nigeria

Eluoma (or Eluama) // is a town in Amawu, Isuikwuato, Abia State of Nigeria. It is the largest town in Isuikwuato, having more than 10 distinct villages. It also occupies the largest geographical space in the whole of Isuikwuato, and has the most varied vegetation, relief and drainage. It shares boundaries with Amiyi Uhu, Amiyi Obilohia, Otampa, Umuasua, Umuobiala, Nnunya and Umuahia. It is a few kilometres from Abia State University, Uturu, Abia State and about 20 kilometres (12 mi) from Umuahia, the capital of Abia State, in the South Eastern part of Nigeria. Eluoma people are Igbos by ethnicity and belong to what was formally called Igbo Union from which the "Central Igbo" was derived.

== Composition ==
The villages or communities that make up Eluoma are Ekebe, Umuama, Umuebere Aja, Umuebere Nkuma (Obu-Na-Ebere Nkuma), Obodo, Umusoo, Umuokogbuo, Umuerem, Ndi Ogu, Umuezeoka, Umuihe (formerly, Umu Ohu) and Igidi-Inyim. Apart from Obodo, Umuama, Umusoo and Ekebe, each of the above villages or communities are geographically separated by distances ranging from two kilometres to seven or more kilometres.

== History ==
The founder and father of people of Eluoma (Eluama) is sad to be Ama, the son of Awu although some people think this ancestral name is a mere deduction from Eluama which later Eluoma people, following Colonial misspelling call the place. The existence of Eluoma in Ahaba-Imenyi, Isuikwuato, Nkpa and Uzuakoli both in Bende Local Government Area of Abia State supports the view that the community's original name was Eluoma. Although the kinship to these other communities have not been properly traced, the uniqueness of the name is a starting point in the quest.

Eluoma people settled in their present location long ago, possibly over three hundred years ago as a part of the general migration that took place at the time.

Umuebere Nkuma and the Obu people occupy the strip of land where the land produces palm products in abundance, cassava, yam and other tropical crops. This portion of land is well watered. It is the food basket of the community. Umuerem and Umuokogbuo people also have a fertile for agriculture.

== Government and politics ==
Like most Igbos, Eluoma people never had a single eze king or ruler in the time past. Communal issues were settled by elders delegated from the different villages who decided on the basis of majority votes. “Igbo ama eze” is how Igbos put it. The same applied in the villages. Adult males took the most important decisions while women always had their own government. Thus decisions were by universal adult male suffrage.

However, in the mid-seventies, the Federal Military Government of Nigeria, led by people of Northern extraction began to foist their oligarchic system of administration on the whole country, particularly the East, through the Military Governors whom they appointed. These governors in turn requested for “chiefs” or traditional rulers to be installed. Like all other Igbo societies, the first generation of chiefs were persuaded to accept the position. The first chief or eze Eluoma had was His Royal Highness, Eze Innocent Eloagu from Umuama. Later on, the same Eloagu went on to become the first eze of Amawu.

At the moment, Eluoma no longer has any one eze or chief ruling it. There are several autonomous communities, following the manipulation of the political class who needed to reduce the powers of traditional rulers. Each village now has its own chief democratically chosen through consultations and recommendation by all adult males.

Eluoma has represented Isuikwuato, perhaps more than any other town, in government political appointments at the state level. It has produced many commissioners in the past. It also produced the Second Republic House Assembly member, Hon. Barrister Vincent Eyi Uwanna. It also produced a military governor. The only town that has a comparable record is Ovim which produced military governors and Federal Minister/Senator although only two did all these for them.

Of particular note is the maverick scholar, philosopher/poet, Chinweizu whose influence straddles the globe, particularly the black world. He hails from Umuokogbuo, Eluoma and has been a source of inspiration and pride to Eluoma people. He has debated other scholar like Ali Mazrui and unmasked Wole Soyinka's obscurantist writings.cateroy:african writers

== Social development ==
The central market for all Eluoma people is Ahonta located between Obodo, Ekebe, Umusoo, Amaeke and Umuebere Aja. This led to the establishment of other social-cultural and economic ventures around Ahonta. A civic centre with a postal agency was constructed in the 1970s through communal efforts. Ahonta Market itself was developed into a modern market in the same 70s by tasking each village to build a block of stalls. There is a health centre and electrification project that did more to divide Eluama people than unite them.

The Eluama Development Union (EDU) co-ordinates socio-cultural development although many have seen its past projects as partial and targeted at marginalising the other villages far away from Ahonta. For example, the electrification of Eluoma was undertaken as a communal project with each household contributing agreed amounts. However, once electricity got to central Eluama, the rest of the Eluoma were left to themselves with the result that two decades after the arrival of electricity in Eluama, some villages were still to enjoy it due their inability to extend it to themselves. Like a family, the offended villages have moved on and Eluoma is one still united entity having more in common that differences.

Of recent, the Eluamna Believers' Fellowship has been collaborating with the EDU and churches to reach out to youths who reside in Eluama through a project tagged Eluoma Youth Development Initiative. The aim is to motivate and mobilise youths towards dreaming big and achieving those dreams. This will stop or reduce the incidence of truancy, crime, thuggery and other social vices in the town.

== Institutions ==
One of the most famous institutions in Eluoma is the Eluoma Central School, now a ghost of itself former self. It was proposed that Eluoma Secondary School, built in the late 1970s through communal efforts, should be done at the site of Eluoma Central School but certain political forces conspired to have the new school built in their backyard. In consequence, much financial resources were wasted building on virgin land. The secondary school could not develop beyond its foundation level. Nevertheless, it has produced important people who are contributing to the development of Eluoma as well as retain its prestige as the highest institution of learning in Eluoma.

Besides, St Agnes Primary School is also popular in terms of products and being one of the oldest schools in Eluoma. Other schools are Uporoto Primary School, Obu-Na-Ebere Primary School and others. There has been some private initiative at establishing secondary schools. Universal Commercial School was founded at Obodo while an Onward Commercial School founded at Ali Ukanze. Both later closed down.

== Festivals ==
The most popular festivals in Eluoma are Christmas, Iri Ji, Ahia Egwu and Onunu Ji. Due to the advance of Christianity though, the rest apart from Christmas and perhaps Iri Ji, are nearly extinct. However, there has been a revival Iri Ji festival, especially with the removal of rituals considered offensive by the overwhelming population of church-going community.

== August meeting ==
Some time ago, progressive-minded women of Eluoma began to organise an annual homecoming for women called August Meeting ostensibly for the development of the land of Eluoma. This entailed a mass return of Eluoma women living outside to Eluoma.

== Drainage ==
Eluama is watered by Eze-Iyi, Adaoma, Ubiyi, Nneochie and many other streams and a few springs. Umuebere Nkuma (Obu-Na-Ebere Nkuma) has the largest number of streams and springs. Sharing the great Eze Iyi with others, they also have Adaoma, Ubiyi, Ndoahau, Iyi NDe Nwoko, Iyi Ndemgbelu, Agboebo, Iyi Eke, Agbouhu, Agbocha, Ugwuede, Onuahia, Onuosovaravara, Onu Okpuocha, Onu Uhie, Onu Uke, Onu Ejiofo, Onu Nkwo, etc.

These streams flow all round the year ensuring that dry season farming is possible in the town. The only exception is Adaoma that dries up at certain portions of it during rainy season and comes back during dry season. The intriguing nature of Adaoma appearing like a lake and then as an underground stream that surfaces at intervals is what probably led to the veneration of the stream by Owu Mmiri people.

UbiIyi serves Umuebere Aja, Obu Aja and even parts of Ekebe and Obodo. Eze-Iyi serves Obodo and Umuama. Both are partly also served by Isi Iyi. Each village or community has a number of streams serving it. Some streams are so far away that they only serve farmers while in their distant farms.

== Relief ==
The town is flat from the entrance from Oguduasaa and Umuobiala ends only. From all other entrances, the town is an amalgam of hills and valleys. The great Valley of Umuebere Nkuma marks a major shift in relief and also affects the drainage.

== Economy ==
Being a rural community, Eluoma survives on subsistence farming and the production and exportation of few cash crops. Water yam, white yam, Yellow yam, coiling yam, cocoa yam, cassavas, beans (odudu), ugu, okro, akwukwo oho (oha), ahahara vegetable and many others keep the people healthy. Others are Bananas of all types, oranges, pears, mangoes, cashews, and kola nuts. There are plenty of vegetables and fruits. Indeed, some species of fruit like "nturu", a fruit which, once you lick it, you eat or drink anything and it would taste as if it has sugar in your mouth. It has been speculated that this fruit could be harnessed and used for diabetic patients in place of sugar.

Palm produce is about the main export and it sustains many households. The interesting thing is that these palms trees up till now grow wild. There has been no attempt by locals to turn what is natural into organised plantations. The government too has done nothing to encourage local or foreign investors in this area.

== Minerals ==
Eluama is unmapped in terms of minerals but it is believed that the Ubiyi Basin has a rich deposit of fossil fuels. In addition, Umuebere Nkuma has large store of construction stones and gravels. The Umuokogbuos and the Obdodos, Umuebere Ajas, Ekebes and even Umuama, have construction sand in abundance.

== Tourism ==
There is a cave also called OMU by the community that has attracted people from all over the world for over 7 decades. It is located between Umuebere Nkuma and Eluoma Central School. The cave is called "Omu Ubiyi". Also is the Adaoma river which can pass as a lake with its distinctive setting. In addition, there is a mini water fall in Ezeiyi Umuihuagwu in Obu-Na-Ebere. There are virgin forests for wildlife tourists and festivals at intervals.

== Language ==
Eluoma people speak Igbo language, like all other Igbos but with their distinct dialect. Even in Isuikwuato, one can easily pick out an Eluoma person from his tongue. With the coming of the British as colonial masters to Nigeria, Eluoma people adopted English as their second language.

== Religion ==
Before the coming of the Europeans, Eluama people were animists and worshiped many gods. These gods included streams like Nneochie, Adaoma, Ubiyi, etc. Some animals also were worshiped as gods, such as Avuala (ajala), that is viper. Some trees were equally regarded as the abode of the gods. Above all, ancestral worship was common to every family.

At the beginning of the 20th century, however, Christianity came to the area. Umuebere Nkuma was the first to be reached through the effort of the Methodist Church which first landed at Ovim in Isuikwuato. Later, the Roman Catholic Church came from the northern part of Isuikwuato. In the past 30 years, the religious landscape of Eluama changed with the arrival of the non-denominational Scripture Union and the Assemblies of God. In this 21st Century, Eluama has Catholics, Methodists, Anglicans and white Garment Churches. There are many Pentecostal churches which drew membership from existing traditional or mainline churches.

== Population ==
There is no official figure as most Eluama people are living outside the town. However, the population is estimated at 30,000. Umuebere Nkuma has the highest number of old people in Eluama. Some say this is because the village is separated from the noisy Ahonta and has vegetables, fruits and natural drinking water in abundance.
