= Marie Celeste Simon =

American biologist and cancer researcher

M. Celeste Simon
- Education: Miami University; Ohio State University; The Rockefeller University
- Scientific career
- Fields: cancer biology
- Workplaces: University of Pennsylvania Perelman School of Medicine; University of Chicago

Marie Celeste Simon is the Arthur H. Rubenstein Professor of cell and developmental biology, the scientific director of the Abramson Family Cancer Research Institute, and the associate director of the Abramson Cancer Center Core Facilities, at the University of Pennsylvania Perelman School of Medicine. Her research focuses on cancer cell metabolism, angiogenesis, and immunology.

Simon earned a B.A. from Miami University in 1977, and a M.S. from Ohio State University in 1980, both in microbiology. She earned a Ph.D. in molecular biology from The Rockefeller University in 1985. She did postdoctoral research with Joseph Nevins at Rockefeller, and with Stuart Orkin at Harvard Medical School.

In 1992, Simon became an Assistant Professor of Medicine and Molecular Genetics and Cell Biology at the University of Chicago. She became a professor at the University of Pennsylvania School of Medicine in 1999.

Simon was an HHMI investigator from 1994 to 2014. In 2017, she was awarded the National Cancer Institute Outstanding Investigator Award. She was elected to the National Academy of Medicine in 2018. In 2021, she was elected member of the U. S. National Academy of Sciences.
