= The West and the Rest of Us =

Nigerian book (1975)

The West and the Rest of Us: White Predators, Black Slavers, and the African Elite
- Author: Chinweizu
- Language: English
- Subject: Post‑colonial critique, Afrocentrism
- Genre: Political theory, cultural criticism
- Publisher: Random House (USA); NOK Publishers (Nigeria)
- Publication date: 1975
- Publication place: Nigeria / United States
- Media type: Print
- Pages: 520 (1st ed.)
- ISBN: 9780394480510

The West and the Rest of Us: White Predators, Black Slavers, and the African Elite is a 1975 non-fiction work by Nigerian critic Chinweizu.

It originated as his doctoral dissertation at State University of New York in Buffalo (SUNY) and was self-published following academic disputes; he later received his PhD after publication. The book provides a sweeping critique of five centuries of Western imperialism and the complicity of African elites in perpetuating neo-colonial structures.

== Background and content ==
Chinweizu earned a PhD in philosophy in 1976, after walking away from his SUNY dissertation and publishing it independently as The West and the Rest of Us in 1975. The work was later republished by NOK Publishers in Nigeria (1978) and Pero Press (1987), expanding the original text.

The book critiques Western imperialism, tracing its impact on Africa and other colonised regions over five centuries. Chinweizu identifies how African political elites enabled domination by mimicking Western institutions and ideologies. He calls for epistemological decolonisation and autonomous development by learning from non-Western models such as Japan, China and Russia.

=== Key arguments ===
- Western powers are “predators” that enslaved and economically exploited Africa.
- African elites served as “black slavers” by sustaining neocolonial dependency.

== Reception and legacy ==
The 2023 African Studies Review described it as a “testament to his profound engagement with global geopolitics and cultural dynamics” and praised its critique of African elites. It remains influential in post-colonial and Afrocentric studies across the Global South.

== See also ==
- Chinweizu
- Afrocentrism
- Decolonisation
- Postcolonialism
- Dependency theory
