= Global apartheid =

Political concept

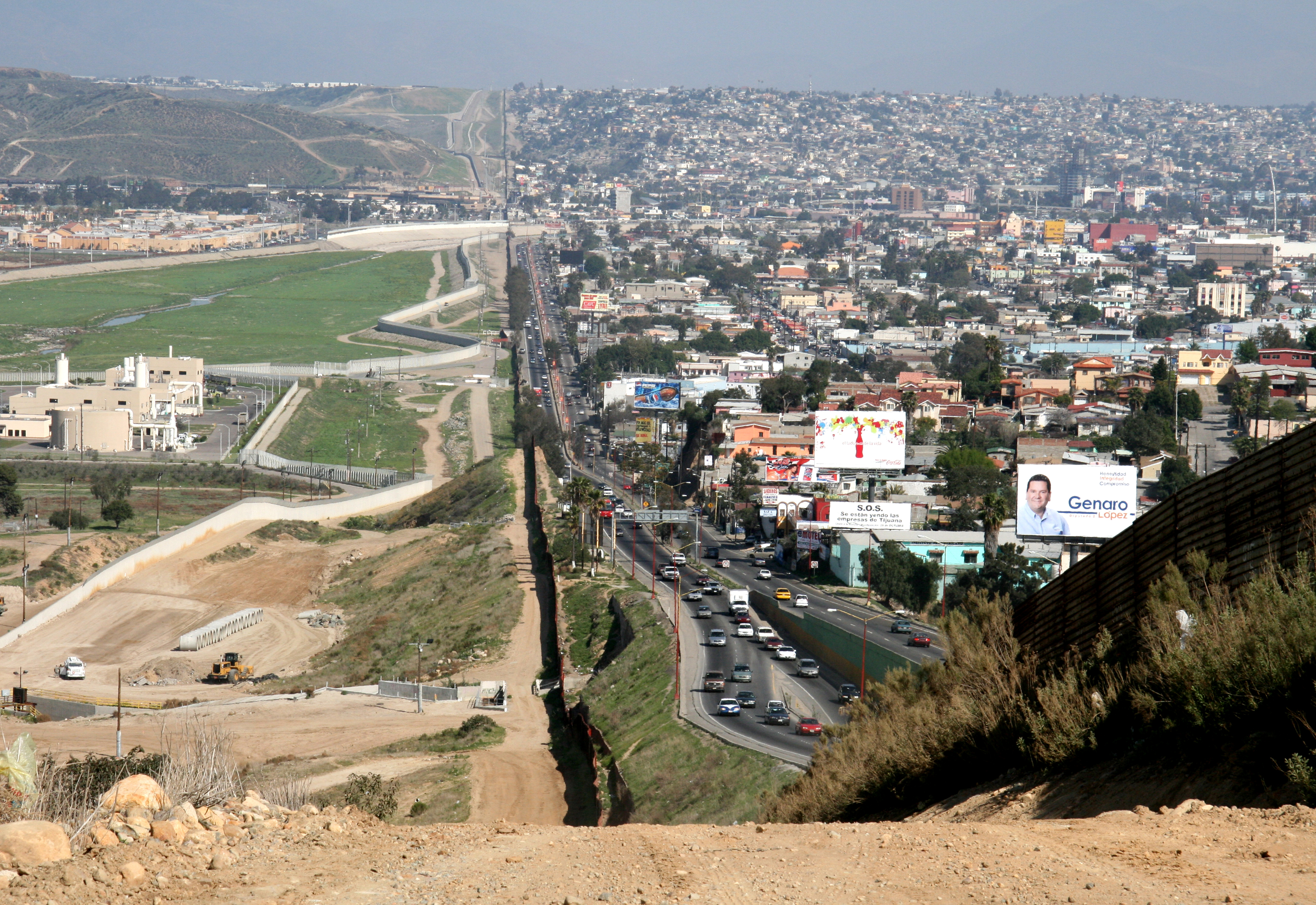
Fence between San Diego's border patrol offices in California (left) and Tijuana, Mexico. Militarized border controls that prevent people from the Global South from moving to the Global North are cited as an example of global apartheid

Global apartheid is a term used to describe how Global North countries are engaged in a project of "racialization, segregation, political intervention, mobility controls, capitalist plunder, and labor exploitation" affecting people from the Global South. Proponents of the concept argue that a close examination of the global system reveals it to be a kind of apartheid writ large with striking resemblance to the system of racial segregation in South Africa from 1948 to 1994, but based on borders and national sovereignty.

The concept of global apartheid has been developed by many researchers, including Titus Alexander, Bruno Amoroso, Patrick Bond, Gernot Kohler, Arjun Makhijiani, Ali Mazuri, Vandana Shiva, Anthony H. Richmond, Joseph Nevins, Muhammed Asadi, Gustav Fridolin, and many others. More recent references are in Falk's Re-Framing the International, Amoroso's Global apartheid: globalisation, economic marginalisation, political destabilisation, Peterson's A Critical Rewriting of Global Political Economy, Jones's Crimes Against Humanity: A Beginner's Guide and Global Human Smuggling by Kyle and Koslowski, and New Social Movements in the African Diaspora: Challenging Global Apartheid. and Bosak's Kairos, Crisis, and Global Apartheid

== Origin and use ==
The first use of the term may have been by Gernot Koehler in a 1978 Working Paper for the World Order Models Project. In 1995, Koehler developed this in The Three Meanings of Global Apartheid: Empirical, Normative, Existential.

Its best known use was by Thabo Mbeki, then-President of South Africa, in a 2002 speech, drawing comparisons of the status of the world's people, economy, and access to natural resources to the apartheid era. Mbeki got the term from Titus Alexander, initiator of Charter 99, a campaign for global democracy, who was also present at the UN Millennium Summit and gave him a copy of Unravelling Global Apartheid.

== Concept ==
Alexander argued that apartheid was a system of one-sided protectionism, in which the rich white minority used their political power to exclude the black majority from competing on equal terms, and warned that "the intensification of economic competition as a result of greater free trade is increasing political pressures for one-sided protectionism."

Alexander claims there are numerous pillars of global apartheid including:

- veto power by the Western minority in the UN Security Council
- voting powers in the IMF and World Bank
- dominance of the World Trade Organization through effective veto power and ‘weight of trade’ rather than formal voting power
- one-sided rules of trade, which give privileged protection to Western agriculture and other interests while opening markets in the Majority World
- protection of ‘hard currency’ through the central banking system through the Bank of International Settlements
- immigration controls which manage the flow of labour to meet the needs of Western economies
- use of aid and investment to control elites in the Majority World through reward and punishment
- support for coups or military intervention in countries which defy Western dominance

More recently, scholars such as Thanh-Dam Truong and Des Gasper, inTransnational Migration and Human Security and Kyle and Koslowsk in In Global Human Smuggling, analyse the rise of migrant smuggling and human trafficking in terms of the "structural violence generated by the escalation of border interdiction by states as part of the system of global apartheid." Political demands for protectionism and physical barriers between the West and the Majority World, such as President Trump's proposed wall between Mexico and the US as well as barriers round the EU follow similar economic pressures to those which entrenched apartheid in South Africa.

Law scholar Dimitry Kochenov argues that citizenship and nationality law is a form of apartheid that creates unequal protection that would never be accepted within the borders of any liberal democracy. "Like slavery, like sexism, like racism, citizenship knows no justification once you leave the purview of those few whom it unduly privileges."

== See also ==
- Allophilia
- Climate apartheid
- Discrimination based on nationality
- Eco-apartheid
