= Andrew Hallett =

Andrew Hallett may refer to:

- Andy Hallett (1975–2009), American actor and singer
- Andrew Hughes Hallett (1947–2019), Scottish economist
