= Archibugi =

Archibugi is a surname. Notable people with the surname include:

- Daniele Archibugi (born 1958), Italian economic and political theorist
- Francesca Archibugi (born 1960), Italian film director and scriptwriter
- Franco Archibugi (1926–2020), Italian economist
