= Acocella =

Acocella is an Italian surname. Notable people with the surname include:

- Joan Acocella (1945–2024), American journalist
- Marisa Acocella Marchetto (born 1962), American author
- Nicola Acocella (born 1939), Italian economist and academic
- Louis Gino Acocella (born 1941), Canadian wrestler, better known by his ring name Gino Brito
