= The Africans: A Triple Heritage =

Documentary television series by Ali Mazrui

The Africans: A Triple Heritage is a documentary history, written and narrated by Dr. Ali Mazrui in the mid-1980s and jointly produced by the BBC and the Public Broadcasting Service (WETA, Washington) in association with the Nigerian Television Authority. A book by the same title was jointly published by BBC Publications and Little, Brown and Company. The film series premiered in 1986 on BBC and controversially on local PBS stations throughout the United States.

== Brief Review of the Series ==
Africa's triple heritage, as envisioned by Mazrui and promoted in this documentary project, is a product resulting from three major influences: (1) an indigenous heritage borne out of time and climate change; (2) the heritage of eurocentric capitalism forced on Africans by European colonialism; and (3) the spread of Islam by both jihad and evangelism. The negative effects of this history have yet to be addressed by independent African leaders, while the West has tended to regard Africa as recipient rather than as transmitter of effects. Yet Africa has transformed both Europe and America in the past, Mazrui points out, and the difficult situation in which Africa finds itself today (economically dependent, culturally mixed, and politically unstable) is the price it has had to pay for Western development.

The series is in nine parts, including the following programs:

1. The Nature of a Continent

In the prologue to this episode, Ali Mazrui questions the positionality of the African continent which is the most central continent in the world, a reality which is not reflected by cartographic representations. Instead, contemporary maps position Africa underneath Europe as if to echo the latter’s lower income and geopolitical standing relative to the former. In his companion volume to the TV series of the same name, Ali Mazrui blames “European ethnocentrism”, reflected in the contemporary map; based on the Mercator projection, which portrays North America as one and a half times the size of Africa. This geographical misrepresentation intentionally dwarves Africa in relation to other continents, misleading people on the continent's true size and geographical potential. An effort to rectify this distortion highlighted by Ali Mazrui was made by Arno Peters’ 1967 Peter’s Projection Map which depicted a more accurate measurement of the respective surface areas of the continents.

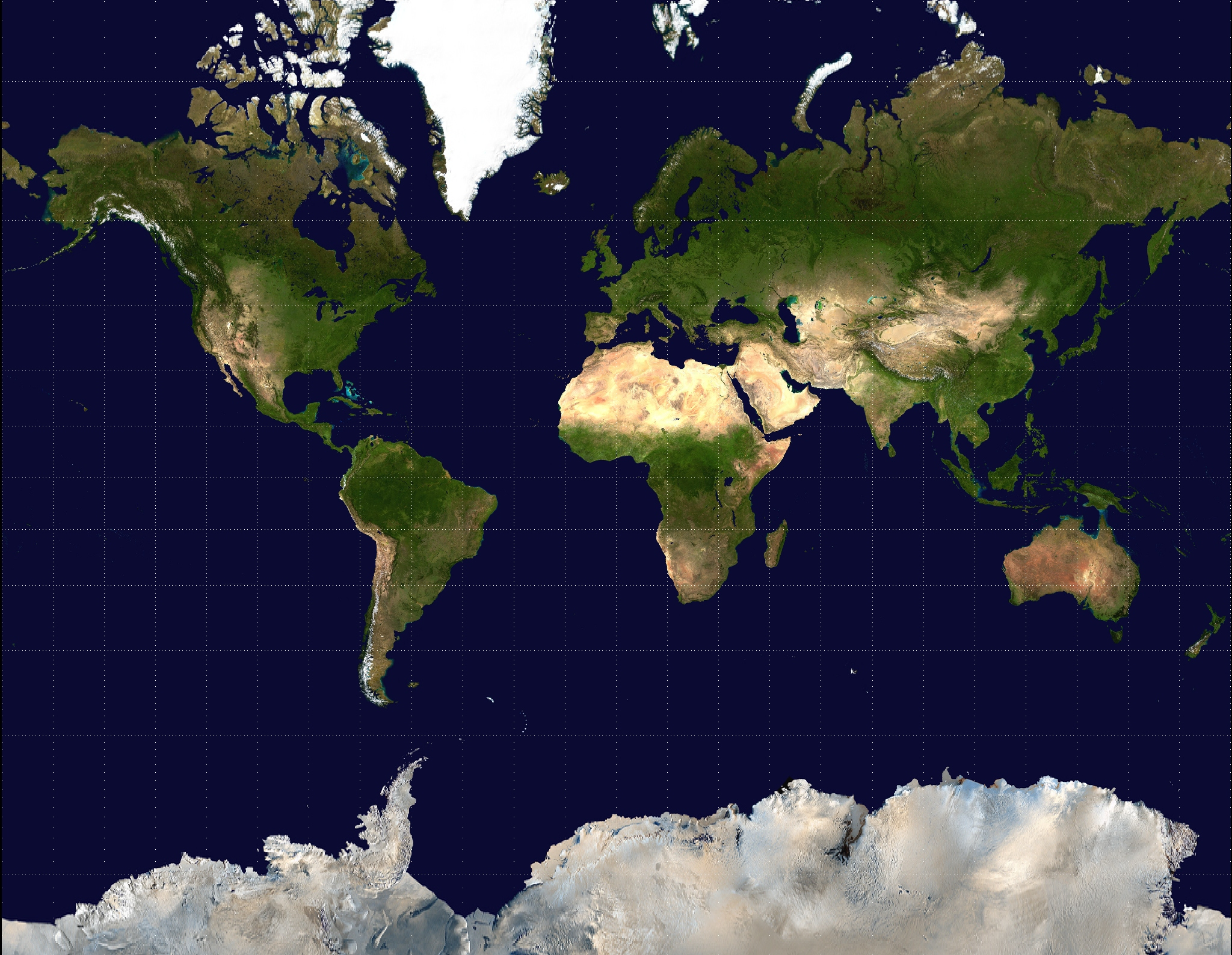
Mercator-projection

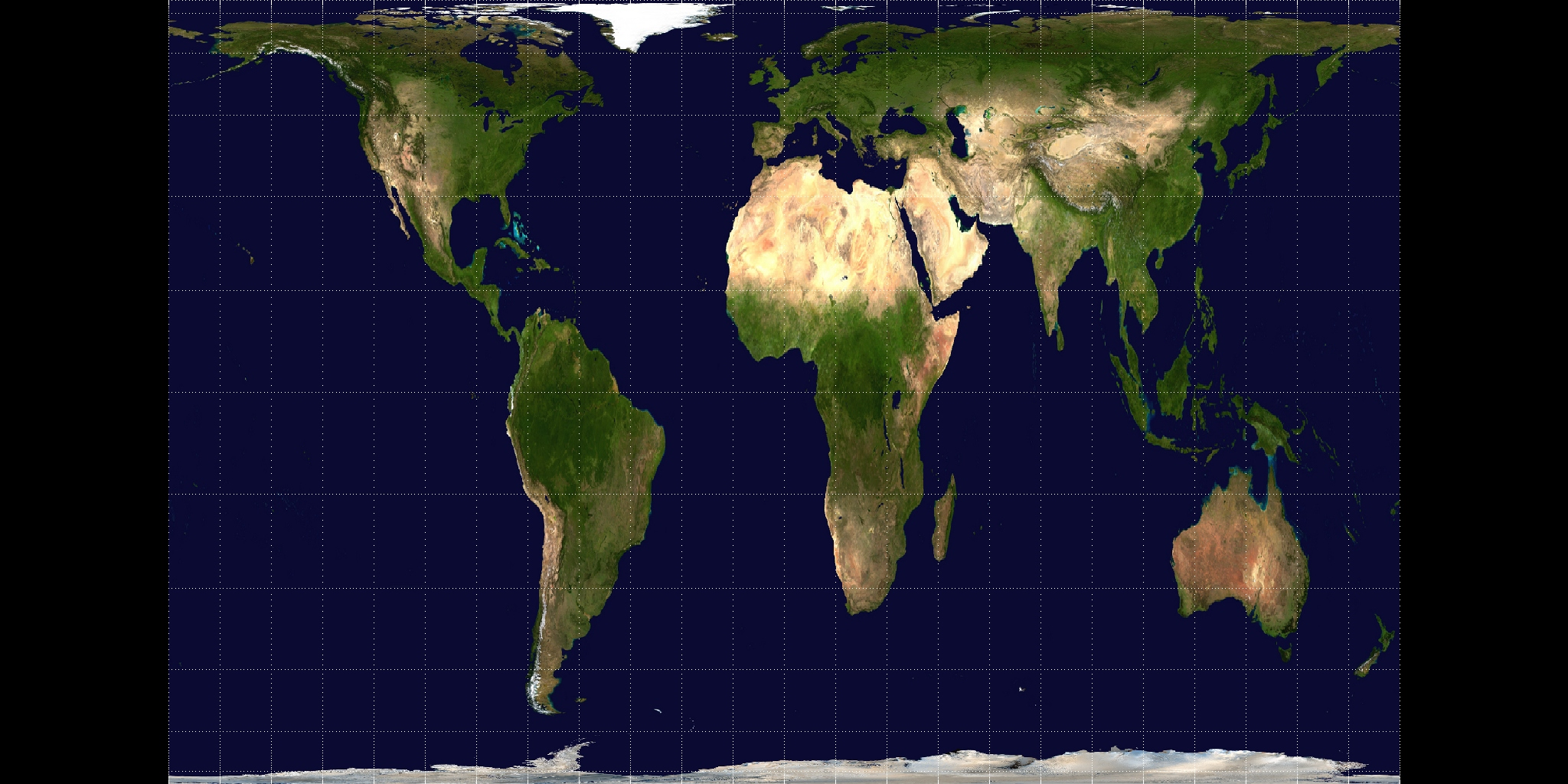
A Gall-Peters projection of a Visible Earth image collected by the Earth Observatory experiment of the U.S. Government's NASA space agency. The reticle is 15 degrees in latitude and longitude.

In his introduction, Ali Mazrui describes geography as “a mother of history”, for the significant role it plays in Africa’s historical and contemporary development. It is nature that made Africa the cradle of mankind, with the Olduvai Gorge hosting early human ancestors such as: Paranthropus “Australopithecus” boisei (Zinjanthropus), Homo habilis, Homo erectus and prehistoric Homo sapiens – refuting racist Western ideologies which viewed Africans as backward people. Ali Mazrui describes these archaeological findings as important in rebutting Charles Darwin’s 19th century Theory of Evolution which was used to promote racism by insisting that different racial groups evolved at different rates with the white races more advanced than black races. Instead, it is Africa that is the birthplace of human culture responsible for developing “the etiquette of eating, the ethics of mating, the rules of behaviour all evolving out of basic human needs”.

Ali Mazrui weaves his own family history in the episode with mention of his family’s connection to the Portuguese built Fort Jesus in Mombasa where his family once ruled the city from that fort, establishing a dynasty that lasted a century. From the Port of Mombasa, Mazrui introduces one of the Triple Heritages of Africa – Islam – which arrived from the ocean by Arabic traders; using the city as a springboard into the region through jihad and evangelism. Islamic infiltration into Africa also came through the Sahara via camel caravans that served as desert superhighways; enabling trade and spread Islam.

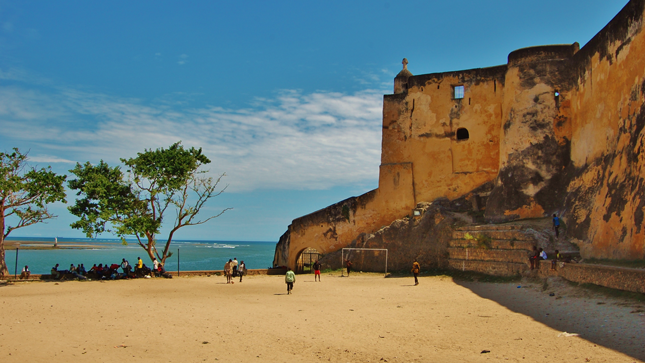
Fort Jesus, Mombasa

Halfway throughout the documentary, Mazrui introduces the colonial period and its lasting impact on the continent. Motivated by political, economic and climatic reasons, Europe’s sights were set on the African continent prompting a scramble for Africa, as different political entities sought to claim a slice of the continent. Describing Man as ‘Homo aestheticus’ Mazrui describes the innate human appreciation for beauty as partly responsible for the migration of Europeans from their native lands to the continent of Africa in the 18th century. Azri also identifies the Industrial Revolution and the ugliness it spawned as another motivating factor for European settlers on the continent. With fair weather and picturesque views, settler colonies take root in the South of the continent in South Africa, Zambia, Zimbabwe and Malawi amongst a host of states.

Although the colonial period was relatively brief in comparison to Africa’s entire period, its impact was deep as shown by its enduring impact on human-nature relations. For Africans, nature became a servant rather than a partner as humans lost their spiritual reverence for animals and saw them as commercial entities to be killed and exploited for their value. In Senegal, Muslim butchers are depicted slaughtering pigs – going against their religious dictates – to fulfil market demands for pork. However, nature remained true to the Africans with the forest offering cover for independence fighters such as the Mau Mau rebellion combatants who sought refuge from British Imperial forces in Kenya’s many forests.

Ali Mazrui’s colourful documentary has not been without criticism as African literature icon, Wole Soyinka wrote extensively against Mazrui’s documentary. Soyinka’s criticism was mainly targeted as Mazrui’s positionality within the documentary. criticised Mazrui’s efforts to speak on behalf of Black Africa based on the latter’s Arabic lineage. Soyinka views the documentary as a product of an Arabic scholar rather than a Black African due to Mazrui’s own self-proclaimed Arabic cultural heritage. The Arabic bias permeates in Mazrui’s documentary where his allegiance to Islam (him being a Muslim) made him an Arabic apologist describing “Western enslavement as more extensive and brutal than that of the Arab slave trade”. As such, Mazrui, grouped himself with the perpetrators of violence against Black persons rather than the victims of external oppression.

2. A Legacy of Lifestyles

3. New Gods

4. Tools of Exploitation

5. New Conflicts

6. In Search of Stability

7. A Garden of Eden in Decay

8. A Clash of Cultures

9. Global Africa

== About the creator ==
Professor Ali Al'amin Mazrui was born February 24, 1933, in Mombasa, Kenya, and died October 12, 2014. During his lifetime he was a distinguished academic, a prolific scholar, and an incisive political commentator on African politics, international political culture, political Islam, and North-South relations. At his death, Mazrui was considered one of the top 100 thinkers in the world. He first rose to prominence as a critic of some of the accepted orthodoxies of African intellectuals in the 1960s and 1970s. He was critical of African socialism and Marxism, that communism was a Western import just as unsuited for the African condition as the earlier colonial attempts to install European type governments and capitalist economic principles. He argued that a revised liberalism could help the continent and described himself as a proponent of a unique ideology of African liberalism.

At the same time Mazrui was a prominent critic of the current world order. He believed the capitalist system was deeply exploitative of Africa, and that the West rarely if ever lived up to their liberal ideals. He opposed Western interventions in the developing world, such as the Iraq War. He was also long been a critic of Israeli militarism, being one of the first to try to link the treatment of Palestinians with South Africa's apartheid.

In his later years, Mazrui became a well-known commentator on Islam and Islamism. While utterly rejecting violence and terrorism, Mazrui has praised some of the anti-imperialist sentiment that plays an important role in modern Islamic fundamentalism. He also argued that Sharia law is not incompatible with democracy.
