= Discrimination based on nationality =

Type of discrimination

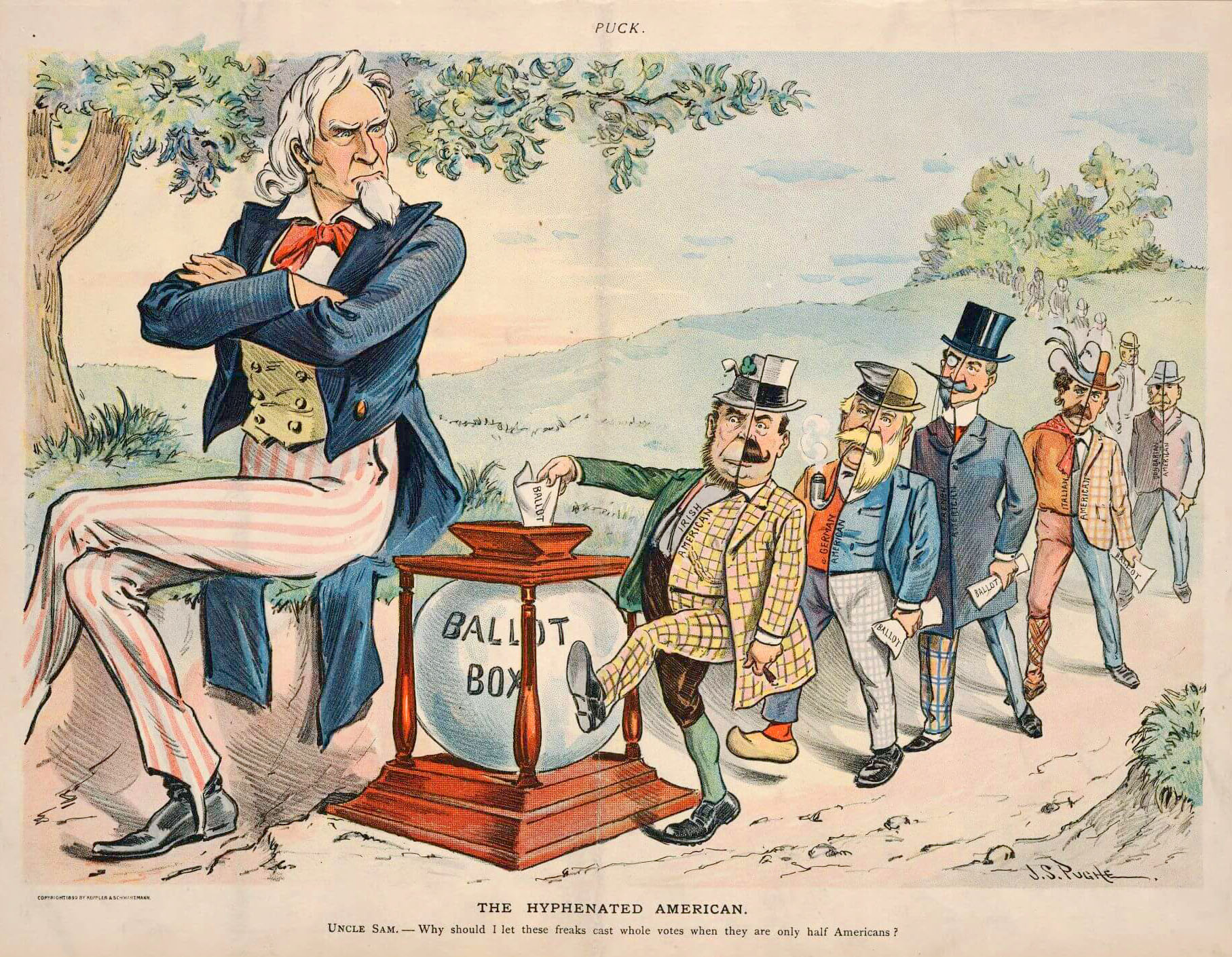
The Hyphenated American (1899) by J.S. Pughe. Cartoon suggesting that immigrants to the United States held divided national loyalties and thus should be prohibited from voting.

Discrimination based on nationality is a type of discrimination against a person based on their nationality, citizenship, or naturalization. Many countries' non-discrimination laws contain exceptions for nationality and immigration status.

== International ==
The International Convention on the Elimination of All Forms of Racial Discrimination (CERD), currently signed by 88 countries, allows discrimination by nationality, citizenship or naturalization but prohibits discrimination "against any particular nationality".

1. In this Convention, the term "racial discrimination" shall mean any distinction, exclusion, restriction or preference based on race, colour, descent, or national or ethnic origin which has the purpose or effect of nullifying or impairing the recognition, enjoyment or exercise, on an equal footing, of human rights and fundamental freedoms in the political, economic, social, cultural or any other field of public life.

2. This Convention shall not apply to distinctions, exclusions, restrictions or preferences made by a State Party to this Convention between citizens and non-citizens.

3. Nothing in this Convention may be interpreted as affecting in any way the legal provisions of States Parties concerning nationality, citizenship or naturalization, provided that such provisions do not discriminate against any particular nationality.

— International Convention on the Elimination of All Forms of Racial Discrimination, Article 1

Article 7(1) of the Refugee Convention prohibits discrimination of the basis of nationality between refugees and aliens.

Some international investment agreements also prohibit discrimination based on the nationality of the investor.

== By juristiction ==
=== United States ===
In the twenty-first century, scholars have sought to address the issue of citizens’ rights in relation to the Equal Protection Clause, which the Fourteenth Amendment extends to ‘any person’ only partially and only with respect to the States (and therefore not within the federal legal order): this approach would supersede the older, most authoritative interpretation of the relationship between nationality, citizenship and humanity.

=== European Union ===
Prohibition of discrimination based on nationality for nationals of European single market member states is a key aspect of the European single market. Article 18 of the Treaty on the Functioning of the European Union (TFEU) bans discrimination based on nationality within the scope of the treaties. According to the European Court of Justice, this prohibition is not applicable to non-nationals of member states of the European Union or European single market.

== Migration law ==
Many states have travel and immigration laws based on nationality, for example offering visa-free travel to nationals of certain states but not others.

A well-known example of discrimination on the basis of nationality is the Executive Order 13769 ("Muslim ban") in which nationals of several Muslim-majority states were prohibited from traveling to the United States.

== Criticism ==
Nationality is related to race and religion, so direct discrimination on the basis of nationality may be indirect discrimination on racial or religious grounds. According to Thomas Spijkerboer, "at face value, migration law is also a form of racial discrimination" under the CERD.

Global apartheid is a term used to describe how Global North countries discriminate on the basis of nationality and deny permanent residency or citizenship to migrants from the Global South as well as discrimination based on nationality in migration law.

According to Gareth Davies, eliminating discrimination based on nationality would create polities based on residence rather than citizenship.

== Labor market ==
One study found that foreign NBA players were paid less than United States nationals of equivalent performance between the 1999-2000 and 2007–2008 seasons.

== See also ==
- Nationality#Nationality versus citizenship
- Democratic globalization
- Self-determination
