= Nicola Acocella =

Italian economist and academic

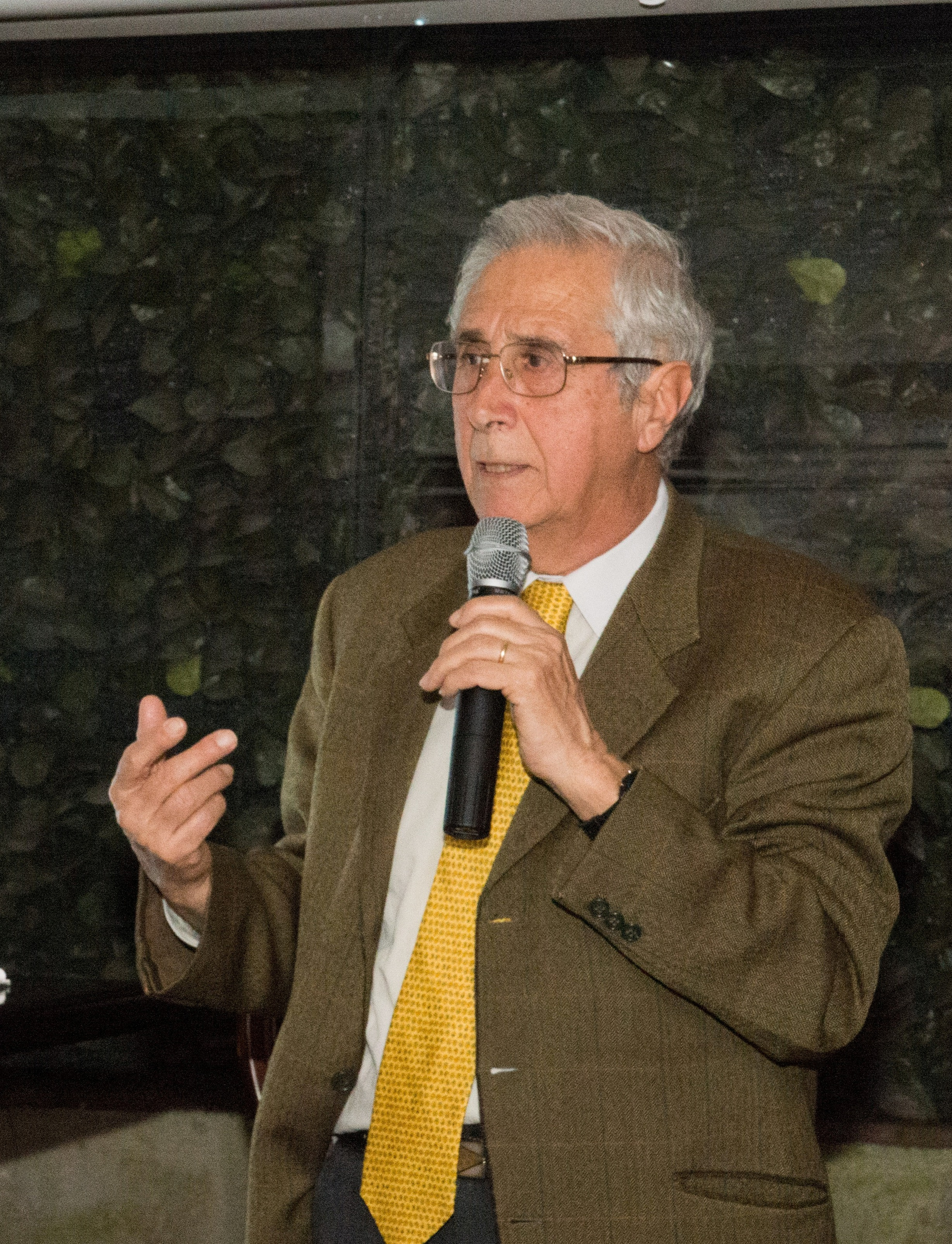
- Nicola Acocella guest of “Trinità dei Monti” Think Tank, a Rome based think tank
- Born: 3 July 1939 (age 87); Calitri, Italy

Academic background
- Education: Sapienza University of Rome
- Influences: Federico Caffè, Bruno de Finetti, Luigi Einaudi, Ragnar Frisch, Jan Tinbergen, Henri Theil, Edmund Phelps, Paolo Sylos Labini, Ezio Tarantelli, Giancarlo Gandolfo

Academic work
- Discipline: Microeconomics, Macroeconomics, Public Policy
- Institutions: Sapienza University of Rome
- Notable ideas: Theory of economic policy, Monetary policy, Fiscal policy European institutions, Oligopoly, Transnational corporations, Theory of public goods, Globalization, Labour market, Trade unions
- Awards: First Medal from the University of Rome ‘La Sapienza’ for 'excellence research' in the theory of economic policy in a strategic context, 2009
- Website: Information at IDEAS / RePEc

Nicola Acocella (born 3 July 1939) is an Italian economist and academic, Emeritus Professor of Economic Policy since 2014.

In 1963 he graduated in Economics from the “Sapienza University of Rome” with a thesis on ‘Time lags in economic policy’, under the supervision of Federico Caffè. After becoming full professor (1980), he got a reputation for his holistic contribution to systematisation and development of Economic policy. He also introduced remarkable innovations in the theory of economic policy as well as in monetary and fiscal policy and the theory of social pacts.

== Academic career ==
During his career Prof. Acocella had the opportunity to exchange views or to co-operate with some of the most important economists of the twentieth century, such as Kenneth Arrow, Amartya Sen and Joseph Stiglitz and other eminent professors like Paul De Grauwe, Alexis Jacquemin, Adrian Pagan, Luigi L. Pasinetti, Douglas Hibbs, Andrew Hughes Hallett, Peter J. Hammond.

He has visited, among others, the University of Cambridge, Oxford, Toronto, Harvard, Reading, Stanford as well as the European Union and the United Nations.

He has been Professor of Economics with the University of Perugia; Professor of Industrial organization and Economic Policy at the University of Calabria; Professor of Economic Policy, Sapienza University of Rome. He has also been Head of the Department of Economics, University of Calabria; Head of the Economics Graduate Studies Program, Sapienza University of Rome; Member of the Research Commission, Sapienza University of Rome

== Membership and associations ==
- Member of the Executive Committee of the ‘Società Italiana degli Economisti’ (EN: ‘Italian Economic Association’) (2007–10).
- Vice-president of the ‘Società Italiana degli Economisti’ (EN: ‘Italian Economic Association’) (2016–)
- Member of the Committee for a full professorship in Macroeconomics, Wirtschaftsuniversität, Vienna (2009).

== Research and contributions to economic analysis ==
Prof. Acocella has developed his expertise in several research fields. He worked first on industrial organisation and globalization. Among his numerous contributions in this field: a dynamic version of the static limit pricing model by Bain, Modigliani and Sylos Labini and a model for transfer pricing by multinational firms as well as a number of essays on the distributional and employment effects of globalization

He has also contributed to the theory of social pacts, their substitutability with other institutions – such as a conservative central banker – in order to ensure monetary stability, their implementation, with specific reference to the long-term Italian issue of a low productivity dynamics.

He has also investigated monetary and fiscal policy, both in abstract terms (dealing in particular with: conditions for their effectiveness, existence of a non vertical long-run Phillips curve, optimal inflation rate) and with reference to the European institutional architecture (optimality of co-ordinated fiscal action and monetary policy orientation).

A final path of analysis has led him to lay down a systematic approach to economic policy as a discipline to some extent autonomous from the rest of economic science, by enquiring on the various needs to heal market failures as well as the directions and the design of public policy.

About one of his contributions the Nobel prize Amartya Sen has said:

“Professor Nicola Acocella has provided an illuminating and challenging account of the foundations of economic policy. His analysis covers the established ground as well as providing new departures; the book is a rich addition to the existing literature.”
Praise for: Acocella, N. [1994], “The Foundations of Economic Policy. Values and Techniques”.

— A. Sen

Of specific interest is his reformulation (together with Giovanni Di Bartolomeo and Andrew Hughes Hallett) of the classical theory of economic policy laid down by Jan Tinbergen, Theil and Ragnar Frisch in a setting immune from Lucas critique. This offers a novel contribution to the analysis of conditions not only for policy effectiveness or neutrality (showing the limits of validity of many currently accepted propositions on the effects of rational expectations and time inconsistency as well as on the role of policy announcements), but also for existence, uniqueness or multiplicity of the equilibrium in strategic games. The theory is of use also in an institutional perspective as a theory of conflict resolutions and optimal institution setting.

== Publishing activities ==
Referee for various journals and international institutions. Among them: Cambridge University Press, Canadian Journal of Economics, Journal of Macroeconomics, Journal of Public Economic Theory, Scottish Journal of Political Economy, United Nations.

== Honours and fellowships ==
- First Medal from the University of Rome ‘La Sapienza’ for 'excellence research' in the theory of economic policy in a strategic context (2009).
- Fellow of the British Academy (1977)
- Fellow of the Canadian Social Sciences and Humanities Research Council (1980)
- Fellow of the American Council of Learned Societies (1980)
- Evaluator for EU research projects (2008, 2010, 2012)

== List of publications ==
A selection of his published works follows:

=== Monographs in English language ===
- Acocella, N. [1998], ‘The foundations of economic policy. Values and techniques’, Cambridge University Press, Cambridge, p. 519, translated into Chinese, Polish, Croatian, ISBN 0-521-58407-8.
- Acocella, N. [2005], ‘Economic policy in the age of globalisation’, Cambridge University Press, Cambridge, p. 509, ISBN 0-521-54038-0.
- Acocella, N. and Leoni, R. (eds.) [2007], ‘Social pacts, employment and growth: a reappraisal of Ezio Tarantelli’s thought’, Springer Verlag, Heidelberg, ISBN 978-3-7908-1915-1.
- Acocella, N., Di Bartolomeo, G. and Hughes Hallett, A. [2013], ‘The theory of economic policy in a strategic context’, Cambridge University Press, Cambridge, ISBN 978-11-07-02386-4.
- Acocella, N., Di Bartolomeo, G. and Hughes Hallett, A. [2016], ‘Macroeconomic paradigms and economic policy. From the Great Depression to the Great Recession’, Cambridge University Press, Cambridge, ISBN 978-11-07-11772-3.
- Acocella, N. [2018], ‘Rediscovering Economic Policy as a Discipline’, Cambridge University Press, Cambridge, ISBN 978-1-108-55670-5.
- Acocella, N. [2020], ‘The European Monetary Union: Europe at the Crossroads’, Cambridge University Press, Cambridge, ISBN 978-1-108-84087-3.

=== Main monographs in Italian language ===
- Acocella, N. [1975], ‘Imprese multinazionali e investimenti diretti. Le cause dello sviluppo’, Giuffrè, Milano.
- Acocella, N. [1983], ‘L'impresa pubblica italiana e la dimensione internazionale: il caso dell'IRI’, Einaudi, Torino, ISBN 978-88-06-05586-8.
- Acocella, N. [1994], ‘Fondamenti di politica economica. Valori e tecniche’, Nuova Italia Scientifica, Roma, (5th ed., Carocci, Rome, 2011), ISBN 978-88-430-6324-6.
- Acocella, N. [1999], ‘Politica economica e strategie aziendali’, Carocci, Roma (5th ed., 2012).

=== Main articles in English language ===
- Acocella, N. [1992], ‘Trade and direct investment within the EC: The impact of strategic considerations’, in: Cantwell, J. (ed.), ‘Multinational investment in modern Europe’, E. Elgar, Cheltenham.
- Acocella, N. and Ciccarone, G. [1997], ‘Trade unions, non neutrality and stagflation’, in: ‘Public Choice’, 91(2): 161–178.
- Acocella, N. and Di Bartolomeo, G. [2006], ‘Tinbergen and Theil meet Nash: controllability in policy games’, in: ‘Economics Letters’, 90(2): 213–18.
- Acocella, N. [2006], ‘Distributive issues in the provision and use of global public goods’, in: ‘Studi economici’, 88(1): 23–42.
- Acocella, N., Di Bartolomeo, G. and Tirelli, P. [2007], ‘Monetary conservatism and fiscal coordination in a monetary union’, in: ‘Economics Letters’, 94(1): 56–63.
- Acocella, N. and Di Bartolomeo, G. [2007], ‘Is corporatism feasible?’, in: ‘Metroeconomica’, 58(2): 340–59.
- Acocella, N., Di Bartolomeo, G. and Tirelli, P. [2007], ‘Fiscal leadership and coordination in the EMU’, in: ‘Open Economies Review’, 18(3): 281–9.
- Acocella, N., Di Bartolomeo, G. and Hughes Hallett, A. [2007], ‘Dynamic controllability with overlapping targets: or why target independence may not be good for you’, in: ‘Macroeconomic Dynamics’, 11(2): 202–13.
- Acocella, N., Di Bartolomeo, G. and Hibbs, D.A. [2008], ‘Labor market regimes and the effects of monetary policy’, in: ‘Journal of Macroeconomics’, 30: 134–56.
- Acocella, N., Di Bartolomeo, G. and Tirelli, P. [2009], ‘The macroeconomics of social pacts’, in: ‘Journal of Economic Behavior & Organization’, 72(1): 202–13.
- Acocella, N., Di Bartolomeo, G. and Piacquadio, P.G. [2009], ‘Conflict of interest, (implicit) coalitions and Nash policy games’, in: ‘Economics Letters’, 105(3): 303–05.
- Acocella, N., Di Bartolomeo, G. and Hughes Hallett, A. [2010], ‘Policy games, policy neutrality and Tinbergen controllability under rational expectations’, in: ‘Journal of Macroeconomics’, 32(1): 55–67.
- Acocella, N., Di Bartolomeo, G. and Hughes Hallett, A. [2011], ‘Tinbergen controllability and n-player LQ-games’, in: ‘Economics Letters’, 113(1): 32–4.
- Acocella, N. [2011], ‘The deflationary bias of exit strategies in the EMU countries’, in: ‘Review of economic conditions in Italy’, 2–3: 471–93.
- Acocella, N. and Di Bartolomeo, G. [2011], ‘The cost of social pacts’, in: ‘Bulletin of Economic Research’, (doi: 10.1111/j.1467-8586.2011.00405.x).
- Acocella, N., Di Bartolomeo, G. and Hughes Hallett, A. [2012], ‘A general theory of controllability and expectations anchoring for small-open economies’, in: ‘Journal of International Money and Finance’, 31(2): 397–411.
- Acocella, N., Di Bartolomeo, G. and Hughes Hallett, A. [2012], ‘Expectations dynamics: policy, announcements and limits to dynamic inconsistency’, in: ‘Studies in Nonlinear Dynamics & Econometrics’, 16(2), DOI: 10.1515/1558-3708, April.
- Acocella, N., Di Bartolomeo, G. and Hughes Hallett, A. [2012], ‘Central banks and economic policy after the crisis: what have we learned?’, ch. 5 in: Baker, H.K. and Riddick, L.A. (eds.), ‘Survey of International Finance’, Oxford University Press.
- Acocella, N., Di Bartolomeo, G. and Tirelli, P. [2012], ‘Inflation targets and endogenous markups in a New Keynesian model’, in: ‘Journal of Macroeconomics’, 34(2): 391–403.
- Acocella, N., Di Bartolomeo, G. and Hughes Hallett, A. and Piacquadio, P.G. [2014], ‘Announcement wars as an equilibrium selection device’, Oxford Economic Papers 66(1): 325-347.
- Di Bartolomeo, G., Tirelli P., Acocella, N. [2014], ‘Trend inflation, the labor market wedge, and the non-vertical Phillips curve’, Journal of Policy Modeling, 36(6): 1022-1035.
- Di Bartolomeo, G., Tirelli P., Acocella, N. [2015], ‘The comeback of inflation as an optimal public finance tool’, International Journal of Central Banking, 11(1): 43-70.
- Acocella, N. [2017], ‘Rise and decline of economic policy as an autonomous discipline: A critical survey’, Journal of Economic Surveys, 31(3): 661-902, 10.1111/joes.12168.
- Hughes Hallett, A., Acocella, N. [2017], ‘Stabilization and expanded commitment: A theory of forward guidance for economies with rational expectations’, Macroeconomic Dynamics, 2016 (Cambridge.org).
- Acocella, N. [2020], ‘How to reform the EU and EMU’, Economia Internazionale/International Economics, 73(3), 325-350.

=== Main articles in Italian language ===
- Acocella, N. [1976], ‘I prezzi di trasferimento nelle imprese multinazionali: problemi di analisi e di politica’, in: ‘Note Economiche’, n. 6.
- Acocella, N. [1979], ‘L'equilibrio oligopolistico in un contesto dinamico’, in: ‘Note Economiche’, n. 5.
- Acocella, N. and Ciccarone, G. [1995], ‘Moderazione salariale e scambio politico: un'analisi micro fondata’, in: ‘Rivista Italiana di Economia’, numero zero, ottobre.
- Acocella, N., Leoni, R. and Tronti, L.[2006], ‘Per un nuovo patto sociale sulla produttività e sulla crescita’, http://www.pattosociale.altervista.org.
- Acocella, N. and Leoni, R. [2010], ‘La riforma della contrattazione: redistribuzione perversa o produzione di reddito? ’, in: ‘Rivista italiana degli Economisti’, 2: 237–74.
- Acocella, N. [2013], ‘Teoria e pratica della politica economica: l’eredità del recente passato’, Rivista di Storia Economica, August 2013, 29 (2): 221-46.

== See also ==
- List of economists
- Sapienza University of Rome
- Federico Caffè
- Bruno de Finetti
- Luigi Einaudi
- Ragnar Frisch
- Adrian Pagan
- Edmund Phelps
- Henri Theil
- Jan Tinbergen
