= Government Secondary School, Afikpo =

Government Secondary School Afikpo
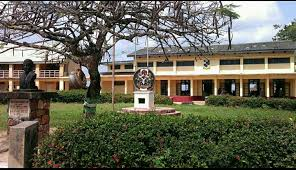

Location
- off Amasiri - Afikpo Road; Afikpo, Ebonyi State; Nigeria
- Coordinates: 5°53′43″N 7°55′42″E

Information
- Type: Secondary School
- Motto: Fear God, Honour the King
- Established: 1952
- Founder: Charles W. Low
- Principal: Hon. Ogbonnia Nwachi
- Gender: Boys
- Age: 11 to 18
- Enrolment: about 1000
- Houses: 9
- Colour: Purple
- Publication: Purple Times
- Pupils: Mgbomians
- Website: http://www.gssaaa.org

Government Secondary School, Afikpo (GSSA) is a boys' secondary school located in Afikpo, a town in Ebonyi State in the former Eastern Region of Nigeria, the part of Nigeria that attempted to secede as the independent state of Biafra in the late 1960s. The Nigerian Civil War was Nigeria's ultimately successful attempt to reintegrate Biafra forcibly into the larger Nigerian polity. GSSA was one of the best of the antebellum “leadership academies” of Nigeria until the war and its aftermath.

== History ==
GSSA was established in 1952 by Charles W. Low.

The first Principal was Charles W. Low, an Australian.

The Present principal is Hon. Ogbonnia Nwachi.

== Academics ==
GSSA was established as an elitist school. The school has continued to be one of the best secondary schools in Nigeria. All students are required to complete a number of core courses in the arts and sciences. Its students constantly achieved high scores in examination results at SSCE, O-Level and A-Level.

== Sports and extra-curricular activities ==
Students of the school also participate in athletics and sports like, cricket, hockey, handball, basketball and football (soccer).

The school also has an Officer Cadet Corps that offers instruction in adventure training, camping and field drills.

== School houses ==
The various houses to which students are assigned upon admission are:

- Afikpo House
- Akabuogu House
- Charles Low House
- Ibiam House
- Ibi Mboto House
- Niger House
- Okpara House
- Ramat House
- School House

== Notable alumni ==
- Chinweizu, pan-African philosopher
- Okwui Enwezor, curator, scholar.
- Lieutenant Commander Lawrence Ewa (Lorenzo), 1985 set. naval officer based in Lagos
- Emmanuel Isu, formal gubernatorial aspirant Ebonyi state
- Anyaoha Samuel Ndubuisi, 1999 set Communication Engineer; Standards Organisation of Nigeria
- John Nwangwu, public health doctor
- Ikenna Okike (CIPD) class of 1999, renowned UK trained human capital development specialist
- Iké Udé, photographer, performance artist, author and publisher
- Dave Umahi, politician
- Justice Oko Orji (DJ Slam), 1998 set - Marine Engineer, Naval Officer (Nigerian Navy)
