= Iké Udé =

Nigerian-American photographer (born 1964)

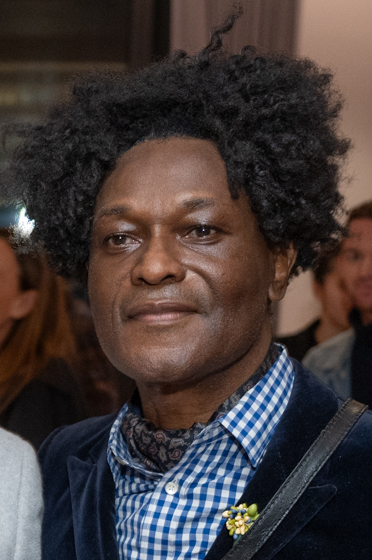
- Udé in 2024
- Born: 1964 (age 61–62); Makurdi, Nigeria
- Occupations: Photographer, performance artist, author, publisher

Iké Udé (born 1964) is a Nigerian-American photographer, performance artist, author, and publisher based in New York City, United States.

== Early life and education ==
Udé was born in 1964 in Makurdi, Nigeria where he was raised. The eldest son of a wealthy family, he was exposed to photography and portraiture at an early age by dressing up for biweekly family portraits.

As an adolescent, Udé attended the Government Secondary School, Afikpo, a British boarding school in Afikpo Nigeria. He was a habitué of London before he moved to New York in 1981 to study Media Communications at Hunter College, CUNY. He began his art career in the late 1980s with abstract painting and drawing. Since the 1990s, photography has been his primary medium.

Udé is a dual citizen of the United States and Nigeria.

== Work ==
=== Early work on paper and paintings ===
Udé's paintings and drawings are less well known than his photography, though critics and art historians have recognized his early work. The late Henry Geldzhaler said of Udé's paintings and works on paper: "I am touched and amazed at the ways in which he manages to blend invisibly the modernist tradition with his own Nigerian roots. There is never anything forced in the conjunction; air and light seem to be his media."

=== Cover Girls ===
Udé began his Cover Girls series in 1994 which established his place in the contemporary scene. Each photograph imitates the cover of a popular fashion or lifestyle magazines, in which the artist himself is featured as the model. The photographs were consciously stylized, posed, photographed and then paired with type matching that of the respected magazine. At first glance, each photograph appears to be an authentic magazine cover. Udé used the magazine cover as a stage to critique the fetishism of the upper class white model and the effects of popular culture on today's consumerist society. He also used the series to comment on issues such as the absence of blackness in fashion, racial stereotyping, and the misrepresentation of people of color. The series was exhibited in 1994 in the New York City gallery Exit Art.

=== Uli ===
Udé's black and white series of photographs, Uli, references high fashion, and Uli body art and wall motifs from Udé's Igbo heritage.

=== Paris Hilton: Fantasy and Simulacrum ===
Udé's Paris Hilton: Fantasy and Simulacrum is a conversation between his alter ego, Visconti, and the celebrity Paris Hilton. The exhibition consisted of several mixed media works, assembled with material from gossip blogs, wallpaper samples, photocopies, mirrors, fashion and lifestyle magazines, and pornography sites. Combined, these pieces illustrate the construction of the Paris Hilton phenomenon, inviting viewers to question what they really know about fame and the aesthetics of cultural decay.

== Recent projects ==
=== Sartorial Anarchy ===
Udé's portraits, most notably those in Sartorial Anarchy, are a combination of wit and historicism. These works possess a contemporary haute couture vibe, or what New York Times art critic Roberta Smith refers to as "irreverent, cultural polyglot self-portraits". In a review for photographmag.com, Jean Dykstra writes, "As much as identity is a cultural construct, it is also an individual creation, and few people have fashioned a self with as much flourish as Iké Udé." In an interview with Monica Miller, Udé said his purpose for creating Sartorial Anarchy was that "Medium-wise, I saw and felt a great need to push the language of photography forward, not at all satisfied by the prevailing old conservative approach and mentality that still obtains massively. I needed a robust visual vocabulary that is very particular, that I own and is instantly recognizable." Udé believes that despite today's level of globalization, people continue to dress according to their particular culture and lack "global conversation sartorially."

Sartorial Anarchy is at once a reference to and departure from dandyism. Udé's conceptual use of historical and contemporary clothing attempts to catalog culture rather than to merely reflect fashion trends. Udé constructs the costumes, props and his own pose as a still life, which is then photographed by an assistant. Udé paints the backgrounds for each photograph and completes post-production procedures himself.

The series was exhibited in The Global Africa Project at the Museum of Arts and Design (MAD) in New York (2010), and in Artist/Rebel/Dandy: Men of Fashion at the Rhode Island School of Design Museum (2013). Udé's series was also exhibited at the Leila Heller Gallery in Chelsea, New York. Entitled Style and Sympathies, this exhibit presented a selection of his self-portraits from the series.

The Minneapolis Institute of Arts, the Sheldon Museum of Art, the Rhode Island School of Design Museum, have acquired works from Sartorial Anarchy.

=== The CHIC Index ===
The CHIC Index is an online anthology of Udé's portraits that depict stylish people in New York City. The photos show the range of the individual's signature "looks," and feature, among others, Geoffrey Bradfield, Robert Verdi, Patrick McDonald, Steven Knoll, Somers Farkas and Jean Shafiroff.

== Publishing ==
=== aRUDE magazine ===
In 1995 Udé created aRUDE magazine, named in homage to the Jamaican rude boys of 1960s London. The magazine is similar to Interview and features conversations with artists, photographers, and designers as well as editorials on fashion, beauty and style. While the magazine began as a print publication, it has been published solely online since 2009.

=== Style File: The World's Most Elegantly Dressed ===
Udé is the author of Style File: The World's Most Elegantly Dressed, published by HarperCollins in 2008. The volume profiles 55 influential arbiters of style. Style File features writings and contributions from Valerie Steel, director and chief curator at the Museum of the Fashion Institute of Technology (F. I. T.), and Harold Koda, the former curator-in-charge of the Costume Institute at the Metropolitan Museum of Art. The publication provides information on all of the 55 women and men profiled, including John Galliano, Oscar de la Renta, Carolina Herrera, Diane von Furstenberg, Dita Von Teese, and Christian Louboutin.

== Publications ==
- Beyond Decorum: The Photography of Iké Udé. Cambridge, MA: MIT Press, 2000, ISBN 978-0262522809. Edited by Mark H.C. Bessire and Lauri Firstenberg.
- Style File: The World's Most Elegantly Dressed. HarperCollins, 2008.
- Nollywood Portraits: A Radical Beauty. Skira Rizzoli, 2016, ISBN 978-8857232294.
