= Ricardo René Larémont =

American political scientist

Education
- Education: Yale University; New York University

Philosophical work
- Institutions: Binghamton University; Columbia University; Vassar College
- Main interests: North Africa Sahel

Ricardo René Larémont is an international consultant, political scientist, and sociologist specializing in conflict resolution, democratization, civil-military relations, and Islamic politics. With nearly three decades across North Africa, West Africa, and the Sahel, and Muslim-majority states, he combines academic expertise with hands-on advisory work for governments, international organizations, NGOs, and the private sector.

== Early life and education ==
Larémont graduated from New York University in 1976 with a B.A., cum laude in political science. He later received Juris Doctor from New York University in 1979 and a PhD in political science from Yale University in 1995. Larémont is fluent in English, French, Spanish and Arabic. He also speaks Italian.

== Career ==
Larémont was a visiting assistant professor of political science at Vassar College in 1995. After that he shortly taught at Columbia University, serving as the assistant director of Institute of African Studies.

He joined Binghamton University in 1997 with joint appointment from the political science and sociology departments. He was also the associate director of the Institute of Global Cultural Studies, headed by Ali Mazrui. In 2002, his title was succeeded by Seifudein Adem.

Larémont was promoted to associate professor with tenure in 2002. In the same year he was elected Chair of sociology department and served until 2007. He became the interim dean of Harpur College of Arts and Science in 2007.

In 2013, Larémont became a senior fellow of Atlantic Council.

== Works ==
 Political Islam: Movements, Ideologies, and Governance in Comparative Perspective. Routledge, 2026. ISBN 978-1041166054

- Islam and the Politics of Resistance in Algeria, 1783-1992. Africa World Press. 1999. ISBN 0-865-43753-X.
- The Causes of War and the Consequences of Peacekeeping in Africa. Heinemann. 2002. ISBN 0-325-07061-X.
- Borders, Nationalism, and the African State. Rienner. 2005. ISBN 978-1588264473.
- Islamic Law and Politics in Northern Nigeria. Africa World Press. 2011. ISBN 978-1-592-21806-6.
- Revolution, Revolt, and Reform in North Africa: The Arab Spring and Beyond. Routledge. 2013. ISBN 978-0415839471.
- Political Islam. Movements, ideologies, and governance in comparative perspective. Routledge. 2026. ISBN 978-1-04-116605-4.

== Membership of Organizations ==
- African Studies Association
- American Political Science Association
- American Institute for Maghreb Studies
- Middle East Studies Association
