= Black orientalism =

"Othering" or critiquing of the East and Arab World due to colonialism in Black academia

Black orientalism is an intellectual and cultural movement found primarily within African-American circles. While similar to the general movement of Orientalism in its negative outlook upon Western Asian and North African – especially Arab and Berber – culture and religion, it differs in both its emphasis upon the role of the trans-Saharan slave trade, Indian Ocean slave trade, Red Sea slave trade, and the Coolie slave trade in the historic relationship between sub-Saharan Africa and the Arab – and greater Muslim – world, as well as a lack of colonial promotion over the Middle East and North Africa region as was promoted by European orientalism in the same region. The term "black orientalism" was first used by Kenyan academic Ali Mazrui in his critique of Henry Louis Gates Jr.'s documentary Wonders of the African World. Supporters of this movement include writers such as Chinweizu.

== Black orientalism and Afrocentricity ==
Black orientalism, prior to its appropriation by religious Christian black nationalists, was formulated within the context of Afrocentricity; Jackson later wrote that it was Molefi Kete Asante who formed the base of its black orientalism:

Adoption of Islam is as contradictory to the Diasporan Afrocentricity as Christianity has been. Christianity has been dealt with admirably by other writers, notably Karenga; but Islam within the African- American community ha [sic] yet to come under Afrocentric scrutiny. Understand that this oversight is due more to a sympathetic audience than it is to the perfection of Islam for African-Americans. While the Nation of Islam under the leadership of Elijah Muhammad was a transitional nationalist movement, the present emphasis of Islam in America is more cultural and religious.

— Molefi Kete Asante, Afrocentricity (1988)

Sociologist, historian and writer Chancellor Williams expounded on Islam and the Arabs' role in Medieval Africa in his crucial book The Destruction of Black Civilization. Published in 1974, it remains Williams' most well known and highly praised magnum opus among Afrocentrists to this day. Chronicling Ancient African civilizations from the Nile Valley to the various West and Central African kingdoms and briefly East Africa, Williams followed in the footsteps of earlier African American authors Robert Benjamin Lewis, WEB Dubois, who published history books and essays on African civilizations and pre colonial societies to correct American and European authors' denial of African history, culture, trade and agency in World history. Unlike those authors, Williams blames what he sees as monolithic Arabs, who he calls "White Arabs" or "Asian" as responsible for the societal collapse of not only Ancient Egypt known as Kemet, but Medieval Christian kingdoms of Makuria and Alwa in Sudan. By extension all of North Africa including the Sahel and Saharan countries to the Swahili Coast. Williams' "White Arab" archetype is a modern American concept of race placed on Ancient African or Arab societies where it doesn't apply. Williams and his later contemporaries also ignore the presence of dark skinned Arabs or Afro Arabs who predate Islam in the Arabian Peninsula, traded with coastal towns in modern Ethiopia, Somalia, Djibouti and Kenya and were also part of the Arab armies conquering North Africa. Afro Persians who are often mistaken for Arabs in Zanzibar and Swahili Coast, are also collapsed into the Arab category. Especially when referring to the Arab Slave Trade. The Arab or Asian invasions, demographic change through migration from outside the Nile Valley and intermarriages between Arab men and African women which Williams notes is one side and forced removal i.e. driving Africans further South away from fertile valleys and coasts of North Africa to South of the Sahara into the interior. Speaking on the Arab incursion in Egypt and North Africa whom Williams refers to in other chapters throughout his book as "Asians" from the Middle East,

There were several consequences of greatest historical importance which are generally not sufficiently stressed...The first was that both Saharan transformation and the steady incursion of Asians pressure more Blacks back into the interior to concentrate in the already limited survival areas where just to subsist was a daily struggle. The second important result was the widespread amalgamation of the races. For the weaker, more submissive blacks remained in Asian occupied territory to become slave laborers and slave soldiers and to witness a ruthless sexual traffic in Black women that gave rise to a new breed of Afro Asians.

— Chancellor Williams, "The Destruction of Black Civilization" (1974)

Moving beyond the usual criticisms of Islamic religiosity by orientalists such as Bernard Lewis, Raphael Patai, Ayaan Hirsi Ali and Daniel Pipes, Williams argues that Islam is not only foreign to Africa (despite Islam's thousand year old history on the continent), but suggest that the brutality of the Arab Slave Trade in East Africa was greater and trumps the European Trans Atlantic slave trade. He further assumes Islam to equate Arab, viewing it as an ethnic religion overlooking its universalism and as a mission civilisatrice of Arab imperialism for oppressing Africans through belittling and denying their identities, denigrating African traditional religions and cultures in the same vain as European Christianity which differs greatly from the ancient Christianity found in Ethiopia, Nubia, Egypt and Libya. As another caveat, Williams ignores the centuries of trade between the Axumite kingdom and Yemen, Nubia and Egypt with Canaan and Arabian Peninsula. Thus, Arab control over African countries is as part of a wider Arab or Asian plot to control the whole of Africa including countries with large non Muslim populations such.

From the earliest times the elimination of these states as independent African sovereignties had been an Asian objective, stepped up by Muslim onslaughts after the Seventh century AD. So the reestablished Black states were still being conquered and Islamized when Europeans began to arrive in greater numbers to impose their rule over both Asians and Africans.

— Williams

The Arab invasion of Egypt, Sudan and North Africa, changes in ethnic makeup from incoming migrants and intermarriages between Arab (also Afro Arab) and Africans, Turks, Persians and later Europeans, coupled with slavery and discrimination towards Africans particularly migrants in Arab countries are reoccurring themes borrowed from Williams and expanded on by Afrocentric orientalists and even Pan Africanists within academia, media, research and authors in Africa and the Diaspora. Reports of Arab discrimination against Africans and current disputes between African and Arab countries concerning access and sharing of the Nile between Sudan, Ethiopia and Egypt as Ethiopia continues to build the Grand Renaissance Dam, also amplify the fears both real and imagined of Arabs seeking to control not only the Nile access but maintaining control of African affairs both internally and externally. The interest of the United Arab Emirates, Saudi Arabia, Turkey which is a non Arab country in military bases Djibouti, trade and historical relations with Sudan, Egypt and Libya has been treated cautiously by African analysts.

Famed Nigerian writer and Pan Africanist Chinweizu Ibekwe known as Chinweizu, builds on Williams' thesis of an Arab plot to control not only North Africa but all of Africa and her resource rich lands. While he recognizes what Bankie F Bankie dubbed the "Afro Arab borderlands", Sudan and Mauritania that flank the Sahel countries, Chinweizu concurs with Williams on Islamization and Arabization in African societies undermining local religion and cultures. Chinweizu borrows ideas of oriental despotism in his perspective on North African and Middle East Arabs as secondary but long standing colonialists of Africa. In his view Arabs are similar to and in some cases, trump European colonialists who are seeking to economically and politically control of Africa through interventions and tight hold on local leadership. He dismisses Arabization and the growth of Islam among Africans as an exaggerated continuation of the Arab plot to subjugate African people. He also writes that Maumar Gadhaffi's interest in Pan Africanism is a roast for Arab domination of African Muslims and Christians. Especially affecting Africans where economic and political power is concerned as Africa is hoped to become a future superpower. In spite of Pan Africanism, Chinweizu, sees no reconciliation between North Africa and the rest of Africa working on Pan African unity or cooperation. He criticizes and at times in his writings and lectures chides the African Union for allowing Algeria and Libya as member states.

== Reaction by Muslim writers ==
The term "black orientalism" was first used by Kenyan academic Ali Mazrui in his online critique of Henry Louis Gates Jr.'s documentary Wonders of the African World. Mazrui had criticized the film for having markedly deemphasized the history of Islam in Africa, to the point where the history of Nigeria – half of whose population is Muslim – was all but absent from the general coverage by the documentary. The term was later used by Sherman Jackson in an article for Islamica Magazine, which criticized Black orientalism as a backlash from the oft-conservative Christian African studies scholars who have seen Black Islam as a political threat of sorts. The article was later included in his book Islam and the Blackamerican.
