= Federico Caffè =

Italian economist

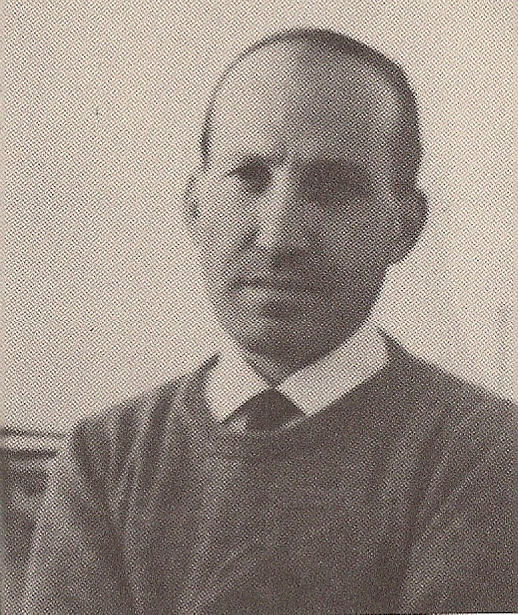
- Born: 6 January 1914; Castellammare Adriatico (present-day Pescara), Kingdom of Italy
- Disappeared: 15 April 1987; Rome, Italy (assumed)
- Status: Declared dead in absentia 30 October 1998
- Education: University of Rome La Sapienza; London School of Economics

Federico Caffè (born 6 January 1914; disappeared 15 April 1987; declared dead 30 October 1998) was a notable Italian economist from the Keynesian School.

== Early life ==
Caffè graduated in Business Sciences from the University of Rome La Sapienza in 1936. After World War II, he spent one year in the United Kingdom studying at the London School of Economics. During that period, he came in contact with the Keynesian Economics and saw up close the policies implemented by the then Labour government. Back in Italy, he started his career working at the Bank of Italy, later becoming a teacher at the University of Messina. From 1959 he taught Economic and Financial Policy at the University of Rome La Sapienza, forming several generations of economists in what is the largest university in Italy.

== Career ==
Caffè mentored several generations of Italian economists, many of whom rose to senior positions in academia, political life and public administration.

In different capacities he mentored the former Governor of the Bank of Italy, and of the ECB President, and Italian Prime Minister Professor Mario Draghi, the former Governor of the Bank of Italy, Ignazio Visco, the planning theorist Franco Archibugi, the welfare economist Bruno Amoroso, the labour economist Ezio Tarantelli, killed by the Red Brigades in 1985 in the courtyard of the Faculty of Economics in Rome where they taught, the former President of the Italian Statistical Office Guido M. Rey, the former President of the Italian Statistical Office and Minister for Infrastructures Enrico Giovannini, the Economic policy's theorist Nicola Acocella, the neo-ricardian economist Fernando Vianello and economist of innovation Daniele Archibugi.

== Views ==
Caffè was particularly interested in economic policy and welfare, especially in their social dimensions. One of his books, Lezioni di politica economica (Lectures on Economic Policy), is widely regarded as the complete summary of his ideas. He was a strong critic of free trade, avowedly Keynesian in inspiration, and also very interested in the Scandinavian welfare model.

== Disappearance ==
On 15 April 1987 Caffè suddenly disappeared, shortly after having quit university teaching. He was "officially declared dead" on 30 October 1998. The mystery involved in his death has not been revealed. He may have committed suicide, but he may also have decided to disappear to an unknown location.

== Memorials ==
Several institutions have been named after him, including the Faculty of Economics of the University of Rome III, the Roskilde University Centre for Southern European Studies and the Library of the Department of Economics of the Faculty of Economics and Business of the Sapienza University of Rome. The Aula Magna of Pescara University is called Federico Caffè also. The Sapienza University of Rome also organizes annual conference that have been held by some of the most significant economists of our age. Many of the lectures have been published in a series of the Cambridge University Press.

== Bibliography ==
=== Main works published by Federico Caffè ===
- Saggi sulla moderna "economia del benessere", (editor), Boringhieri, Torino (1956)
- Economisti moderni, (editor), Garzanti, Milano (1962); reprinted, Laterza, Bari, (1971).
- Politica economica, Boringhieri, Torino (1966 e 1970 - two volumes)
- Teorie e problemi di politica sociale, Laterza, Bari (1970)
- Un'economia in ritardo, Boringhieri, Torino (1976)
- Lezioni di politica economica, Bollati Boringhieri, Torino (1978)
- L'economia contemporanea. I protagonisti e altri saggi, Edizioni Studium, Roma (1981)
- In difesa del welfare state, Rosenberg & Sellier, Torino (1986). New and augmented version, 2014, edited by Paolo Ramazzotti, ISBN 9788878852341

=== Works published after his disappearance ===
- La solitudine del riformista, Bollati Boringhieri, Torino (1990), Edited by Nicola Acocella and Maurizio Franzini, ISBN 88-339-0556-X
- Scritti quotidiani, Manifestolibri, Roma (2007), ISBN 88-7285-491-1; which collects the writings he published on the newspaperil manifesto from 1976 to 1985.
- Contro gli incappucciati della finanza. Tutti gli scritti: Il Messaggero 1974-1986, L'Ora, 1983-1987, Edited by Giuseppe Amari, Castelvecchi, Roma, 2013.
- La dignità del lavoro, a cura di Giuseppe Amari, Castelvecchi, Roma, 2014, ISBN 88-6826-570-2

== See also ==
- List of people who disappeared mysteriously (1980s)

== Sources ==
- Acocella, N. (5th edition ed.), "F. Caffé, Lezioni di politica economica", Bollati Boringhieri, Torino, 1990, ISBN 978-88-339-5457-8.
- Acocella, N., "In difesa del welfare state, dieci anni dopo", in: Acocella, N. & Rey, G. M. & Tiberi, M. (eds), "Saggi di politica economica in onore di Federico Caffè", vol. III, Franco Angeli, Milano, 1999.
- Daniele Archibugi, Federico Caffè, solitario maestro, Micromega, n. 2, (1991)
- Ermanno Rea, L'ultima lezione, Einaudi, Turin (1992)
- Riccardo Faucci, "L'economia per frammenti di Federico Caffè", Rivista italiana degli economisti, n. 3 (2002)
- Bruno Amoroso, La stanza rossa - Riflessioni scandinave di Federico Caffè, Edizioni Città Aperta, Troina (Enna), (2004)
- Giuseppe Amari (editor), Federico Caffè: un economista per il nostro tempo, Roma, Ediesse, 2009. ISBN 978-88-230-1298-1
