= Kipyego Cheluget =

Kenyan diplomat

Dr. Kipyego Cheluget
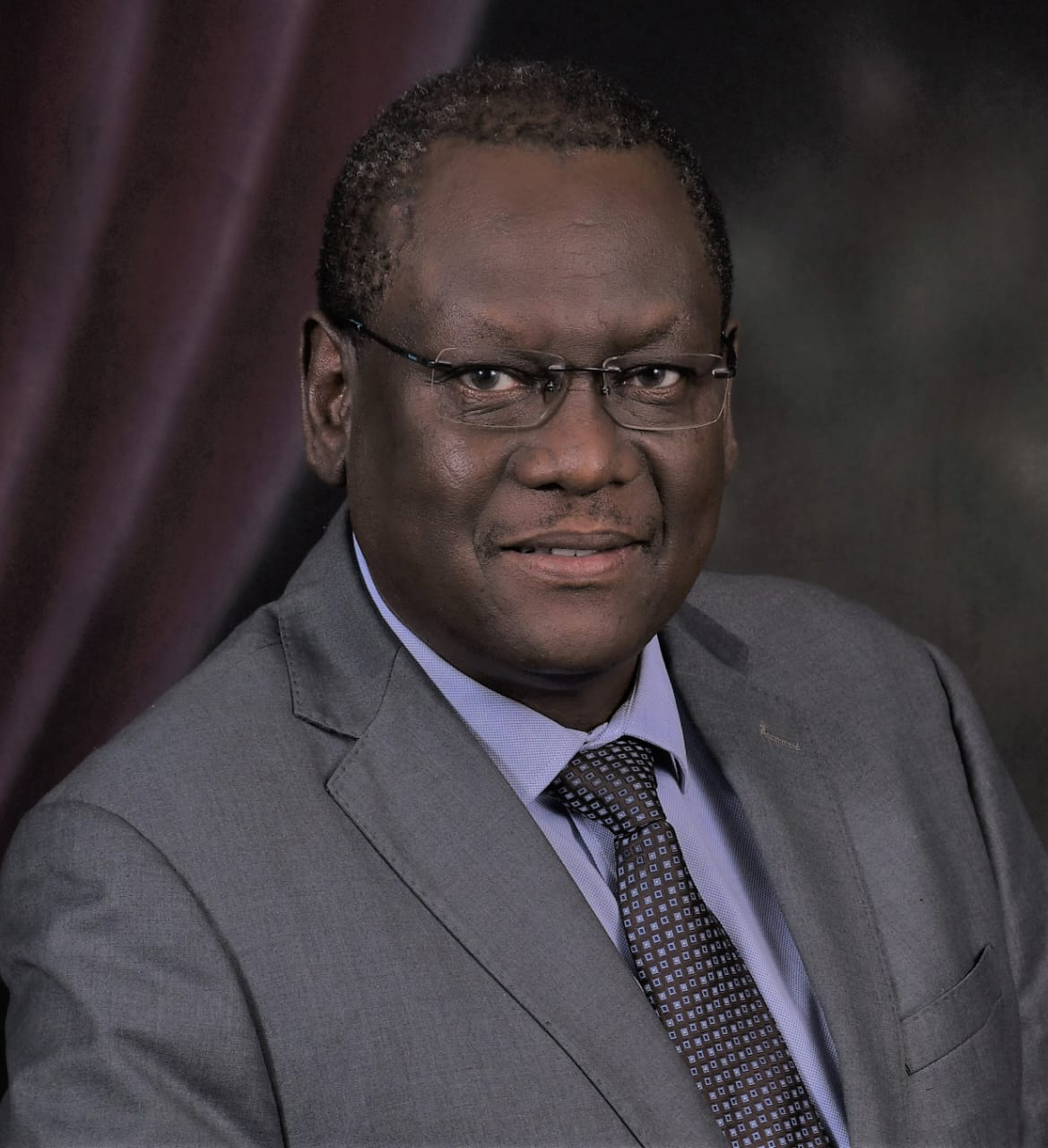

Personal details
- Born: Kipyego Cheluget; 5 October 1956 (age 69)
- Spouse: Ruth Jeruto Limo Cheluget (m. 1983)
- Education: Northern Arizona University (PhD); Illinois State University (MSc), (BSc)
- Occupation: Diplomat

Kipyego Cheluget (born 5 October 1956) is a Kenyan diplomat known for his contributions to regional diplomacy in Eastern and Southern Africa. His career spans roles as the Kenyan High Commissioner to Zambia and Malawi, Permanent Representative to the Common Market for Eastern and Southern Africa (COMESA), and Assistant Secretary-General of COMESA. Dr. Cheluget has also served in leadership positions at the East African Community, showcasing his commitment to regional integration and cooperation. He is also an author, having written "Kenya's Fifty Years of Diplomatic Engagement: From Kenyatta to Kenyatta".

== Early life and education ==
Kipyego Cheluget was born in Uasin Gishu at the Eldoret District Hospital. His educational journey began at Cheptil Primary School (1964–1970), followed by Lelmokwo Secondary School (1971–1974) and Nairobi School (1975).

In 1975, he pursued higher education in the United States, attending Warren Wilson College in North Carolina. His academic pursuits continued at Illinois State University, where he obtained a Bachelor of Science in Political Science and Government (1979) and a master's degree in the same field in 1980.

Dr. Cheluget furthered his studies at Northern Arizona University, earning in a PhD in Political Science and Government.

== Career ==
Upon his return to Kenya, Dr. Cheluget began his career as the Assistant Secretary at the Ministry of Foreign Affairs and International Co-operation in 1985. His academic background and expertise were later used in academia as he lectured at Kenyatta University's History Department and Moi University's Department of Government and Public Administration between 1987 and 1990.

== Diplomatic career ==
Dr. Cheluget's diplomatic career flourished when he returned to the Ministry of Foreign Affairs, assuming roles such as Head of Research, Counselor (Political), and Deputy Head of Mission at the Kenya High Commission in India from 1992 to 1997. Subsequently, he held key positions at the ministry, including Head of the Asia & Australia Division, Deputy Chief of Protocol, Head of the Middle East Division, and the United Nations Security Council Unit.

Between 1999 and 2001, Dr. Cheluget served as the Chief of Conflict Prevention, Management, and Resolution at the Intergovernmental Authority on Development (IGAD) in Djibouti. His dedication to regional organisations continued as he joined the East African Community, where he rose to the position of Deputy Secretary-General.

In 2010, Dr. Cheluget's diplomatic prowess was acknowledged by the Kenyan president, Mwai Kibaki, who appointed him as the High Commissioner of Kenya to Zambia and Malawi, concurrently serving as the Permanent Representative to COMESA. Noteworthy achievements during his tenure include arranging the first official state visit for President Mwai Kibaki, leading to the reopening of the Malawi High Commission in Nairobi and successful negotiations on Bilateral Air Services Agreements.

Currently, Dr. Kipyego Cheluget holds the position of executive director at the Nyerere Centre for Peace Research in Arusha, Tanzania. Additionally, he serves as the Vice Chairperson of the Board at ASARECA (Association for Strengthening Agricultural Research in Eastern and Central Africa) in Entebbe, Uganda, further contributing to regional development and cooperation.

== List of publications ==
1. Kenya's Fifty Years of Diplomatic Engagement: From Kenyatta to Kenyatta.
2. COMESA and the Tripartite Free Trade Area: Towards an African Economic Community?.

== Awards and recognitions ==
Dr. Kipyego Cheluget was awarded with the Moran of the Burning Spear for role played as Deputy Secretary-General for Projects and Programmes at the EAC in 2005 by President Kibaki.

In 2018, Dr. Kipyego Cheluget was inducted into the Northern Arizona University's Hall of Fame for his Diplomatic achievements.
