= Franco Archibugi =

Italian scholar (1926–2020)

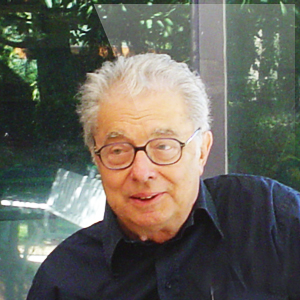
Franco Archibugi

Franco Archibugi (18 September 1926 – 23 November 2020) was an Italian scholar in political, economic and social sciences, university professor in economic policy and spatial planning. He largely operated in Italy and in international governmental agencies; including in the field of economic development, social welfare and cooperation policy. Archibugi was the author of several works in planning theory and methodology, and was among the theorists and promoters of a new unitary discipline of planning – the “Planology” – aimed at creating a bridge between the theoretical scientific progress in economics and other social sciences with the actual political and administrative efficiency and management. After retiring from academia, he was still an active researcher as President of the Planning Studies Centre. He died in Rome in November 2020 at the age of 94.

== Biography ==
Born in Rome in 1926 and son of the violinist Corrado Archibugi and Adelina Francia, he was the grandson of the art historian Ennio Francia.

He participated in the Resistance with small demonstrative actions such as the throwing of leaflets of socialists in cinemas and with the scattering of four-pointed nails on the Via Flaminia in Rome. After the liberation of Rome in 1944, he was one of the leaders of the renewed Italian Socialist Youth Federation led by Matteo Matteotti, Leo Solari and Mario Zagari, with whom a long association was born together with his peer Giorgio Ruffolo. In those years, he also contributed to the foundation of the Italian Section of the Fourth International, together with Giorgio Ruffolo and Livio Maitan.

He had his first job at the Ministry of Reconstruction, collaborating closely with the Minister Meuccio Ruini and with his head of cabinet Federico Caffè, representing Italy in Europe for the implementation of the Marshall Plan. With Federico Caffè, he maintained a deep friendship until his disappearance.

Student of the Institute of Philosophy of the Faculty of Letters and Philosophy of the Sapienza University of Rome, he had as teacher Guido Calogero and as friends and classmates young people such as Lucio Colletti, Emilio Garroni, Tullio Gregory and Gennaro Sasso, writing his thesis on the German Enlightenment under the guidance of Carlo Antoni.

After the split of the Italian Socialist Party, he joined, together with the entire Socialist Youth Federation, the Italian Liberal Socialist Party (later PSDI) led by Giuseppe Saragat. He started working at Italian Confederation of Workers' Trade Unions (CISL), collaborating with Pietro Merli Brandini.

After the death of Eugenio Colorni, in 1944, he had a long friendship with Ernesto Rossi, connected to the joint professional commitment for the Italian economic reconstruction and to the common pro-European ideals. He was later one of the young officials who initiated the process of European integration as Director General of the European Coal and Steel Community in the late 1950s.

Ideally close to the socialist intellectuals, he had progressively distanced himself from the PSI when Bettino Craxi was appointed secretary, so much so that he supported other lists such as that of the Radical Party in 1987 and that led by Massimo Severo Giannini in 1992.

Archibugi was one of the promoters of programming in Italy in the 1960s, collaborating closely with Antonio Giolitti and Giorgio Ruffolo. Professor of Urban Planning, he has taught at University of Calabria, University of Naples Federico II and at National School of Administration (Italy).

Founder in 1963 and President of the Planning Studies Centre, he was among the supporters (and promoters) of a new unified planning discipline. He contributed to the development of planning techniques in the urban, territorial and economic fields, collaborating with United Nations, the European Commission and the Organisation for Economic Co-operation and Development and with the Nobel Laureates for Economics Jan Tinbergen, Ragnar Frisch, Wassily Leontief and Richard Stone. Together with Jacques Delors and Stuart Holland he proposed to go beyond capitalist planning.

In recent years, he had worked hard on a massive trilogy on the programmatic approach, published last year by publisher Palgrave Macmillan.

== Private life ==
Married to the poet Muzi Epifani in 1953, he had four children with her, Luca, Daniele, Francesca and Albertina. After the separation, he had a fifth child by Karla Koenig, Mathias, and a sixth child, Alessandro, by his second wife Fulvia Banchi. His house outside Rome at Divino Amore, in addition to hosting - since 1981 - the headquarters of the Planning Studies Centre, has been an intense hub of cultural, musical and social life.

The elder brothers of his grandfather's father were Francesco and Alessandro Archibugi, volunteers of the University Battalion of Sapienza and died in defence of the Roman Republic (1849). As great-grandson, Franco kept their memory alive by participating in the commemorations, also as a member of the National Association of Garibaldi Veterans.

== Education ==
1944–1952: Sapienza University of Rome. Degree in History and Philosophy.

1947–1950: ISE- BCI- [Institute of Economic Studies. Rome department]

1963–1964: London School of Economics (LSE). One year Diploma in 'Economics and Social Administration'.

== Political-professional profile ==
- From the beginning, Franco Archibugi merged research activities with his political and professional activities. In 1945-1950 (immediately after World War II) he was – before the college degree - junior officer in the governmental administration for the country’s reconstruction and European cooperation policy. [At the Ministry of Reconstruction and at the Committee of Ministers for ERP-European Recovery Program, (The “Marshall Plan”) in Rome, and later in Paris at the OECE].
- Between 1951–56, he became an economic and educational consultant of the Italian Confederation of Workers' Trade Unions (CISL); and from 1956-57 held the position of Chairman of the Economic Committee (of the European Regional Organisation of the International Confederation of Free Trade Unions (ICFTU) (London-Bruxelles); in such role he participated at the negotiations of the Rome’s Treaties for the creation of European Economic Community.
- He later became Chief of the Technical Secretariat of the Comitato dei Ministri per il Mezzogiorno (Committee of Ministries for the South) (1958–59). During 1960-1962 he was Director at the High Authority of the European Coal and Steel Community, for labour, industrial and regional re-conversion questions, in Luxembourg.
- In 1962, he returned to Italy (Rome), to open the "Planning Studies Centre" (Centro di studi e piani economici, in Italian), together with a multidisciplinary team of colleagues, sponsored by some Italian public agencies. As Director of the Centre, Archibugi dedicated himself to the studies and practical experiences of a unified approach to development analysis and planning - as required in that time by the United Nations; giving technical-scientific support to the implementation of economic programming of the Italian Government (from 1963 to 1975), through an intense cooperation with the Ministry of Budget and Economic Planning.
- In the same time Franco Archibugi was also acting as expert in the following international initiatives on integrative socio-economic planning issues, be it technical-scientific or operative:

For the United Nations, as consultant of the United Nations Center for Housing, Building and Planning (New York City, 1968-73); as project manager of some UNDP projects (1971-77); and member of the Senior economic advisers, a steering body of the United Nations Economic Commission for Europe (in Geneva) (1970- 75).

For the European Economic Community (later Union), he has been member and reports-writer of several Committees of analysis and evaluation, concerning economic urban and regional policies and, after the “Maastricht act”, social cohesion policies; and has been director of several multi-year projects within “EU Research Framework Programme”, in more than one edition.

For the OECD and the Council of Europe, he has been speaker in several inter-governmental Seminars on innovations in the socio-economic policies.

== Research and academic activities ==
Franco Archibugi has constantly accompanied his technical-professional activities and experiences by research activities (which in their turn resulted in a systematic and scientific concept of planning methodology). After the decline of the experiences of economic planning in Italy (but also elsewhere, in the 1960s and 1970s, whether in developed or developing countries and in the UN activities), Franco Archibugi focused more intensively his attention and energy on the introduction of a unified approach to planning in the educational and academic world; he has been Full Professor at some Italian Universities and finally at the “Scuola Superiore della Pubblica Amministrazione” [Postgraduate School of Public Administration] in Rome. He has been also active in an international networking of scholars who pursue the same intellectual path towards the integrative, socio-economic, unified planning; and for a new scientific experience – the “planology” (never implemented in its appropriate terms), and which he tried to illustrate like new disciplinary field, autonomous and free from its components disciplines (economics, sociology, physical planning, and so on) in a real meta-disciplinary approach: the ‘planological’ (or ‘programming’) approach. Franco Archibugi has been member of the Association of European Schools of Planning and active in several of its Congresses, and also at the World Planning Schools Congress (WPSC) and in the activities of the GPEAN (Global Planning Education Association Network). He has also been associate at the EAEPE (European Association for Evolutionary Political Economy) participating in some of its Congresses. He was also a member of other academic Italian associations like SIEDS (Società Italiana di Economia, Demografia e Statistica) and SGI, (Società Geografica Italiana); of which he was honorary member, and many others. In his works, Archibugi has often expressed openly his intellectual debt and his derivations of thinking to some great scholars such as Gunnar Myrdal, Ragnar Frisch, Jan Tinbergen and Wassily Leontief. (Of the last three, he has also benefited from friendly personal relations). He believed he followed in their traces, tried to relaunch their thinking (never rightly known and understood); and he hoped to have updated, completed and made explicit the meaning of their work in some way.

== Publications ==
Over the last years of his life, he completed a trilogy which summarize his own work and ideals, and published in 2019.

- The Programming Approach and the Demise of Economics. Volume I: A Revival of Myrdal, Frish, Tinberger, Johansen and Leontief (Palgrave Macmillan, London, 2019).
- The Programming Approach and the Demise of Economics. Volume II: Selected Testimonies on the Epistemological 'Overturning' of Economic Theory and Policy (Palgrave Macmillan, London, 2019).
- The Programming Approach and the Demise of Economics. Volume III: The Planning Accounting Framework (PAF) (Palgrave Macmillan, London, 2019).

Here is an essential selection of the most significant works by Franco Archibugi in the four different, but interwoven fields on which he got some attention and influence:

=== Epistemology of social sciences and “Planology” ===
1992. Towards a New Discipline of Planning. Palermo, “First World Conference on the Planning Sciences”; republished in “Socio-economic Planning Sciences, An International Journal”, vol.30 (1996) N.2 Full Text

1996. Program Indicators: Their Role and Use in the Integrated Social or Community Programming (Papers from the First World-Wide Conference on Planning Science,) ( Social Indicator Research, vol.39, N.3, 1996).Full Text

1999. The “programming’ approach”: methodological considerations based on the contributions of Frisch, Tinbergen and Leontief. In Saggi di politica economica in onore di Federico Caffè (a cura di N.Acocella et alii,). Franco Angeli, Milano 1999 ISBN 88-464-1627-9English Version

2000- Introduction to Planology: the paradigm shift in social sciences, PSC publisher, 2000 Summary

2008. Planning Theory, from the Political Debate to the Methodological Reconstruction, Springer, 2008. ISBN 978-88-470-0695-9Summary and some initial Praise

Forthcoming. The programming approach and the dissolution of economics. A manifesto against determinism in the social sciences.

=== Analysis of the structural change and the future of the Welfare State ===
1956. Perspective of the industrial relations in the age of automation. Panorama delle relazioni industriali nell’epoca dell’automatismo. [Consiglio Nazionale delle Ricerche, CNR.1957.] [only in Italian.]

1969 Income policies and planning policy: criteria and models. ed. with F.Forte [Politica dei redditi e pianificazione. Criteri e Modelli. (a cura). Etas-Kompass, 1969.] [only in Italian]

1979. Toward the planning’s collective bargaining: evolutionary aspects of relationship between planning and collective bargaining.[PSC publ.; only ital.]

1993. Insight into European Cohesion. A contribution to the Study of a Policy for the Strengthening of Socio-economic Cohesion in Europe. (Only in English). [PSC publ.). Summary

2000. The Associative Economy: Insights beyond the Welfare State and into Post-Capitalism, (Macmillan, 2000). ISBN 0-312-22380-3

2008. Between neo-capitalism and post-capitalism: a challenging turn of societal reform (Testo completo in “International Review of Sociology”, Vol.18, No.3, 2008 Testo Completo

Forthcoming: Between neo-capitalism and post-capitalism: a challenging turn of societal reform (PSC publ.)

=== Spatial planning, territorial and urban ===
1966 - City-region in Italy: cultural premises and programmed hypotheses. [only in Italian] Boringhieri 1966. Summary

1979. Principles of Regional Planning: 1.Methods and Objectives; 2. Programs and Budgeting. [only in Ital.] Franco Angeli editore. ISBN 88-204-1717-0 Summari in English

1989 Economy and Ecology. Towards Sustainable Development (eds. with P. Nijkamp). Kluwer Academic Publ. [ISBN, 0-7923-0477-2] (only English) Summary and Index

1994. Theory of Urbanistics: Lessons on a Reappraisal of the Foundations of Urban Planning PSC publ. Summary and Index

1997. The Ecological City and the City Effect, Ashgate, 1997 Summary and Index

1998 - The Future of Urban Quality in Europe. Towards a New European Urban Systems: Concepts and strategy. European Commission 1998. Summary

1999. Urban Ecosystems in Italy. A proposal for balanced urban, territorial and environmental re-organization at regional-national scale. [only in Ital.] Gangemi Editore, Roma] ISBN 88-7448-967-6 Summary

2005- Rome: a new urban planning strategy, Routledge, 2005.ISBN 0-415-30366-4 Summary

=== Strategic planning in the public and non profit domain ===
2002. Introduction to strategic planning in the public domain. PSC, Rome Summary

2004. Compendium of strategic planning for the Public Administrations, Alinea Firenze ISBN 88-8125-864-1 (Only in Italian) Summary

2004. Strategic planning and environmental governance. An international Symposium.[only Ital.] (edited with A.Saturnino). Alinea, Firenze, ISBN 88-8125-863-3.

2005. Introduction to strategic planning in the public domain. [only in Italian] Alinea 2005. ISBN 88-8125-739-4 2008. From bureaucrat to manager: past, present and future of strategic planning in Italy [only Ital.], Rubbettino, 2008. ISBN 978-88-498-2265-6

2008. From bureaucrat to manager: past, present and future of strategic planning in Italy [only Ital.], Rubbettino, 2008. ISBN 978-88-498-2265-6 Summary
