= Amiyi =

Rural community in Ogbaru, Anambra, Nigeria

- Village
- Country: Nigeria
- State: Anambra
- Local Government Area: Ogbaru
- Seat: Ogbaru

Amiyi is a rural community in Ogbaru Local Government Area of Anambra state, Nigeria. It is in Anambra North senatorial district in Anambra State. It is an Igbo speaking community whose members are mainly farmers.

== Flooding in Amiyi ==
Amiyi is a flood prone area, having recorded so many flood incidences, such as that which occurred in 2018, where a nine-year old was drowned with flood while fetching water
