= Bruno Amoroso =

Danish/Italian economist (1936–2017)

Bruno Amoroso (December 11, 1936 – January 20, 2017) was a Danish/Italian economist, author, and Emeritus Professor of Economics at the Department of Society and Globalization of the Roskilde University. He was internationally best known for his work on globalisation.

== Biography ==
Amoroso graduated in Economics at the University La Sapienza, in 1966 under the supervision of Federico Caffè.

After graduation, Amoroso started his academic career in 1970 as researcher and lecturer at the University of Copenhagen. In 1972 he moved to the University of Roskilde, where he eventually was appointed the Jean Monnet Chair at Roskilde University. Since 2007 he was Docent Emeritus at the University of Roskilde, Jean Monnet Chair. At the Roskilde University he has been President of the Federico Caffè Study Centre. He has been particularly active in facilitating cultural exchanges, especially in social and economic issues, among Italy and the Scandinavian countries.

Amoroso was a professor also at the International University Bac Ha of Hanoi, Vietnam; guest professor at the University of Calabria (Italy), La Sapienza, Rome; Atalim (Ankara), Bari, and other universities.

His latest work was an auto-biography which he published in Italian.

Amoroso died on January 20, 2017, at the age of 80.

== Selected publications ==
- Amoroso, Bruno. On globalization: Capitalism in the 21st century. Macmillan, 1998.
- Amoroso, Bruno, Jespersen and Greve (eds). Globalisation and Welfare: A Festschrift for Bruno Amoroso, Roskilde University. Roskilde University, 2003.

Articles, a selection:

- Amoroso, Bruno. "Development and crisis of the Scandinavian model of labour relations in Denmark." European Industrial Relations (1990): 71-96.
