= Chinweizu =

Nigerian critic, poet and journalist (born 1943)

- Born: Chinweizu Ibekwe; 26 March 1943 (age 83); Eluoma, Isuikwuato, Abia State, Nigeria
- Other name: Maazi Chinweizu
- Education: Government Secondary School, Afikpo; Massachusetts Institute of Technology
- Occupations: Critic, poet, journalist
- Notable work: The West and the Rest of Us (1975); Toward the Decolonization of African Literature (1983)

Chinweizu Ibekwe (born 26 March 1943), known mononymously as Chinweizu, and also by the pen-name Maazi Chinweizu, is a Nigerian critic, essayist, poet, and journalist. While studying in the United States during the Black Power movement, Chinweizu became influenced by the philosophy of the Black Arts Movement. He is commonly associated with Black orientalism and emerged as one of the leading figures in contemporary Nigerian journalism, writing a highly influential column in The Guardian of Lagos.

== Background and education ==
Chinweizu was born in 1943 in the town of Eluoma, in Isuikwuato, in the part of Eastern Region of Nigeria that is known today as Abia State, located in the southeastern region of Nigeria. He was educated at Government Secondary School, Afikpo in Ebonyi State, and later attended college at the Massachusetts Institute of Technology (MIT), where he studied philosophy and mathematics, earning a Bachelor of Science degree in 1967, the year of the outbreak of civil war in Nigeria, which lasted two and a half years. At the time living in Cambridge, Massachusetts, Chinweizu founded and edited the Biafra Review (1969–70).

He enrolled for a Ph.D. at the State University of New York at Buffalo, under the supervision of political scientist Claude E. Welch Jr. Chinweizu apparently had a disagreement with his dissertation committee and walked away with his manuscript, which he got published as The West and the Rest of Us: White Predators, Black Slavers, and the African Elite by Random House in 1975. He took the book to SUNY, Buffalo, where he demanded, and was promptly awarded, his Ph.D. in 1976, one year after he had published the dissertation. Thus, the publication settled his disagreement with his advisers in his favour.

== Teaching and themes ==
Chinweizu started teaching overseas, at MIT and San Jose State University. He had returned to Nigeria by the early 1980s, working over the years as a columnist for various newspapers in the country and also working to promote Black orientalism in Pan-Africanism. In Nigeria, he became a literary critic, attacking what he saw as the elitism of some Nigerian authors, particularly Wole Soyinka, and he was editor of the Nigerian literary magazine, Okike. Chinweizu's notable intervention on this theme came in the essay "The Decolonization of African Literature" (later expanded into the 1983 book Toward the Decolonization of African Literature), to which Soyinka responded in an essay entitled "Neo-Tarzanism: The Poetics of Pseudo-Transition". Among Chinweizu's other works is Anatomy of Female Power, in which he discusses gender roles, masculinity and feminism.

Chinweizu has argued that the Arab colonization and Islamization of Africa is no different from European imperialism. The violent conquests, forced conversions and slavery perpetrated by European Christians were also perpetrated by Arab Muslims. In fact, the colonization and enslavement of Africa by Arabs began before the Europeans and continues to this day in Sudan, Mauritania and other countries in the Sahel region. Recently he published a comparative digest that shows the parallel history of European and Arab atrocities against indigenous Africans. He has been critical of the popular illusion that Islam is free of slavery and racism. Islam and Arabian culture are just as much foreign invasive forces as Christianity and European culture.

== Selected bibliography ==
Books

- The West and the Rest of Us: White Predators, Black Slavers, and the African Elite, Random House, 1975. ISBN 978-0394715223
- Energy Crisis and other poems, Nok Publishers, 1978
- Toward the Decolonization of African Literature, Vol. 1: African Fiction and Poetry and Their Critics (with Onwuchekwa Jemie and Ihechukwu Madubuike), Howard University Press, 1983. ISBN 978-0882581224
- Invocations and Admonitions: 49 poems and a triptych of parables, Pero Press, 1986. ISBN 978-9782358875
- Decolonising the African Mind, Sundoor, 1987. ISBN 978-9782651020
- Editor, Voices from Twentieth Century Africa: Griots and Towncriers, Faber and Faber, 1989. ISBN 978-0571149308
- Anatomy of Female Power: A Masculinist Dissection of Matriarchy, Pero, 1990. ISBN 978-9782651051
- The Reconstituted Virgin and Other Satires, Serujtabooks, 2022. ASIN B0BN4Q1FNL (As Maazi Chinweizu)
- 432 Centuries of Recorded Science and Technology in Black Africa, Serujtabooks, 2023. B0BWYB96K2 (As Maazi Chinweizu)

Essays

- "Prodigals, Come Home!" (1973), in Tejumola Olaniyan and Ato Quayson, eds, African Literature: An Anthology of Criticism and Theory, Oxford: Blackwell, 2007. ISBN 978-1405112017.

== See also ==
- Anti-feminism
- The Manipulated Man
