= Joseph Nevins =

American activist, writer and academic

Joseph Nevins is an American author, activist and associate professor of geography at Vassar College in New York.

== Background ==
Joseph Nevins studies socio-territorial boundaries and mobility, imperialism, global apartheid and forms of political violence, political ecology, and matters of human rights, international law and social justice in the aftermath of mass atrocities. He has conducted research in East Timor, Mexico, and the United States-Mexico border region.

Nevins' writings have appeared in numerous journalistic publications, including Aljazeera English, Boston Review, CounterPunch, The Christian Science Monitor, the International Herald Tribune, The Nation, Los Angeles Times, The Progressive, and The Washington Post.

== Biography ==
Born and raised in Boston to a working-class family, he attended the city's public schools, including the prestigious Boston Latin School. He graduated with a bachelor's degree from Middlebury College in Vermont in 1987. It was as a student there that he became politically active, engaging in solidarity work with Central America, and efforts to end CIA recruitment on campus. He received a Ph.D. in geography in 1999 from UCLA.

A long-time solidarity activist with East Timor, Nevins is a founding member of the East Timor Action Network. He visited East Timor many times during the years of the Indonesian occupation and was the first American to meet with the East Timorese guerrilla movement. Under the pen name Matthew Jardine, he authored numerous articles and two books on the war and occupation, and on U.S. and Western complicity in Indonesia's crimes. In 1999, he helped to organize and coordinate the largest non-governmental observer mission for the UN-run plebiscite in East Timor which resulted in the country's eventual independence.

A father of two girls, Nevins is also a board member of the Tucson-based BorderLinks, a bi-national organization that offers experiential educational seminars along the border focusing on the issues of global economics, militarization, immigration, and popular resistance to oppression and violence. He is also a founder and board member of La'o Hamutuk, the East Timor Institute for Reconstruction Monitoring and Analysis.

He is a blogger for the North American Congress on Latin America's "Border Wars."

== Major works ==
- A Not-So-Distant Horror: Mass Violence in East Timor (Cornell University Press, 2005)
- Operation Gatekeeper: The Rise of the Illegal Alien and the Making of the US-Mexico Boundary (Routledge, 2002)
- Dying to Live: A Story of U.S. Immigration in an Age of Global Apartheid (City Lights, 2008)
- Operation Gatekeeper and Beyond: The War on "Illegals" and the Remaking of the U.S.-Mexico Boundary (Routledge, 2010)
