= Andrew Hughes Hallett =

British economist (1947–2019)

Council of Economic Advisers (Scotland)
- In office 2007–2014

Scottish Fiscal Commission
- In office 2014–2016

Scottish Growth Commission
- In office 2016–2019

Adviser for Economic and Monetary Affairs (European Parliament)
- In office 2015–2019

Personal details
- Born: 1 November 1947 London, United Kingdom
- Died: 31 December 2019 (aged 72)
- Education: University of Warwick (BA); London School of Economics (MSc); Nuffield College, Oxford (DPhil)
- Known for: Economic policy and coordination

Andrew Jonathan Hughes Hallett FRSE (1 November 1947 – 31 December 2019) was a Scottish economist. He was University Professor of Economics and Public Policy at George Mason University, Senior Research Fellow at King's College London and Honorary Professor of Economics at the University of St Andrews He was also a member of the Scottish Growth Commission.

Andrew Hughes Hallett was educated at Radley College. He graduated with a BA (Hons) in economics from the University of Warwick in 1969 and a MSc (Econ) from the London School of Economics in 1971. He was awarded a DPhil in economics by University of Oxford in 1976.

He was a lecturer in economics at the University of Bristol from 1973 to 1977, associate professor of economics at Erasmus University Rotterdam from 1977 to 1985, and David Dale Professor of Economics at Newcastle University from 1985 to 1989. In 1989, Hughes Hallett was appointed Jean Monnet Professor of Economics at the University of Strathclyde in Scotland, a post he held until 2002, when he became Professor of Economics at Vanderbilt University in Tennessee. He was appointed to professorships in Economics and Public Policy at George Mason University and at the University of St Andrews in 2007. In 2016, he became Senior Research Fellow in Economics at King's College London and Professor of Economics at the Copenhagen Business School in Denmark. Professor Hughes Hallett was also a visiting professor at Princeton University, Harvard University, Cardiff University, Free University of Berlin, and the Universities of Rome (Sapienza University of Rome), Paris and Milan.

== Contributions to economics ==
Theory of Economic Policy, Political Economy, Monetary Integration, Sustainable Fiscal Policies, Demographic Change, Fiscal Rules, Monetary Policy, Inter-institutional and Inter-country Policy Coordination; Dynamic Games and Bargaining Models, Regionalism and Federalism, Time Varying Cyclical Decompositions, Numerical Methods in Econometrics.

== Government and advisory ==
Scottish Council of Economic Advisers

Andrew Hughes Hallett served as a member from its inauguration in 2007 until after the 2014 Independence Referendum.

Commissioner, Scottish Fiscal Commission

The Fiscal Commission is responsible for scrutinizing and evaluating the government's forecasts for the revenues from devolved taxes, GDP, the implications for public debt and deficits, and to a limited degree recommending improvements if sustainability would be threatened.

Scottish Growth Commission

Charged with designing an economic framework for an independent or financially autonomous Scotland, and policy arrangements to support it.. This includes a system of fiscal rules, debt control, currency choice, a financial regulation system to meet Scotland's needs, trading arrangements under Brexit, growth policies, diversification, a sovereign wealth fund.

Adviser for Economic and Monetary Affairs

Quarterly reports on selected questions in monetary policy, macro-prudential regulation and policy coordination in the Euro-zone economies. Published by the European Parliament's Economics Committee.

== Books ==
- Macroeconomic Paradigms and Economic Policy (with G. Di Bartolomeo and N. Acocella) (2016)
- The Theory of Economic Policy in a Strategic Context (with G. Di Bartolomeo and N. Acocella) (2012)
- Monetary Policy Coordination and European Monetary Union (ed.) (2001)
- Fiscal Aspects of European Monetary Union (ed.) (1999)
- New Advances in Empirical Macroeconomic Modelling (ed.) (1999)
- Control, Expectations and Uncertainty: Problems in the Design of Economic Policies (with S.Holly) (1989)
- Stabilising Speculative Commodity Markets (with C. L. Gilbert and S Ghosh) (1987)
- Applied Decision Analysis and Economic Behaviour (1984)
- Quantitative Economic Policies and Interactive Planning (with H. J. B. Rees) (1983)

== Papers in scientific journals ==
- 218 papers in peer-reviewed journals: American Economic Review, Economic Journal, European Economic Review, Journal of Economic Dynamics and Control, Oxford Economic Papers, Journal of Development Economics, Journal of Applied Econometrics etc; of which 11 have been reprinted in books of special readings.
- Also 97 papers contributed to books, 15 government or agency reports, 8 expert witness reports, and regular evidence to Parliaments.
- Publications in Mathematics, Economic History, Political Science

== Distinctions ==
- Past Editorships (3), Editorial Boards (8)
- Ranked in the top 2/3% of economists world-wide (304/50180) by publications, citations and readership (RePEc ranking service, May 2017, unfiltered). h-index in the top 5% world-wide.
- Fellow of the Royal Society of Edinburgh (Scotland’s academy of sciences); listed in the London Mathematical Society’s directory of mathematicians..
- Referee for Research Council Projects in the UK, the EU, Canada, the Netherlands, Belgium, and the NSF in the US.
- Regular expert witness to Parliaments (the UK, Scotland, Sweden, the Netherlands, European Union)

== See also ==
- List of economists
