= Pavitt's Taxonomy =

Pavitt's Taxonomy categorizes mostly large industrial firms along trajectories of technological change according to sources of technology, requirements of the users, and appropriability regime (Pavitt 1984). The taxonomy aims to classify innovation modes according to different sectoral groups and the flow of knowledge between such groups. It was first proposed by Science Policy Research Unit (SPRU) researcher Keith Pavitt at the University of Sussex and has since been applied in innovation research to describe and categorize industries and the firms therein (Archibugi 2001). According to Castellacci (2008), "Pavitt's model of the linkages between science-based, specialized suppliers, scale-intensive and supplier-dominated industries provides a stylized and powerful description of the core set of industrial sectors that sustained the growth of advanced economies during the Fordist age."

== Pavitt's Taxonomy ==
Pavitt's taxonomy consists of four categories of industrial firms:

1. Supplier-dominated: includes firms from mostly traditional manufacturing such as textiles and agriculture which rely on sources of innovation external to the firm.
2. Scale-intensive: characterized by mainly large firms producing basic materials and consumer durables, e.g. automotive sector. Sources of innovation may be both internal and external to the firm with a medium-level of appropriability.
3. Specialized suppliers: smaller, more specialized firms producing technology to be sold into other firms, e.g. specialized machinery production and high-tech instruments. There is a high level of appropriability due to the tacit nature of the knowledge.
4. Science-based: high-tech firms which rely on R&D from both in-house sources and university research, including industries such as pharmaceuticals and electronics. Firms in this sector develop new products or processes and have a high degree of appropriability from patents, secrecy, and tacit know-how.

== See also ==
- Innovation
- Innovation system
