= Jörg Meyer-Stamer =

German academic

Jörg Meyer-Stamer was a German political scientist and economic development practitioner. He was passionate about developing economic development frameworks and methods that enabled stakeholders in developing countries to diagnose and improve their contexts. He developed methods and frameworks that enabled stakeholders to diagnose and improve local economic development, clusters, value chains and innovation systems. He also wrote several papers on structural change, technology, innovation and industrial policy.

He worked in many developing countries to build local capacity, support local economic development and advise governments and international development organisations like the Deutsche Gesellschaft für Internationale Zusammenarbeit, International Labour Organization and Inter-American Development Bank. He was passionate about the industrial heritage and structural change programmes in Germany. He frequently hosted tour groups of decision-makers from developing countries in Germany to explore structural change, industrial heritage and local development issues.

He was born on 30 October 1958 in Germany and he died on 1 May 2009.

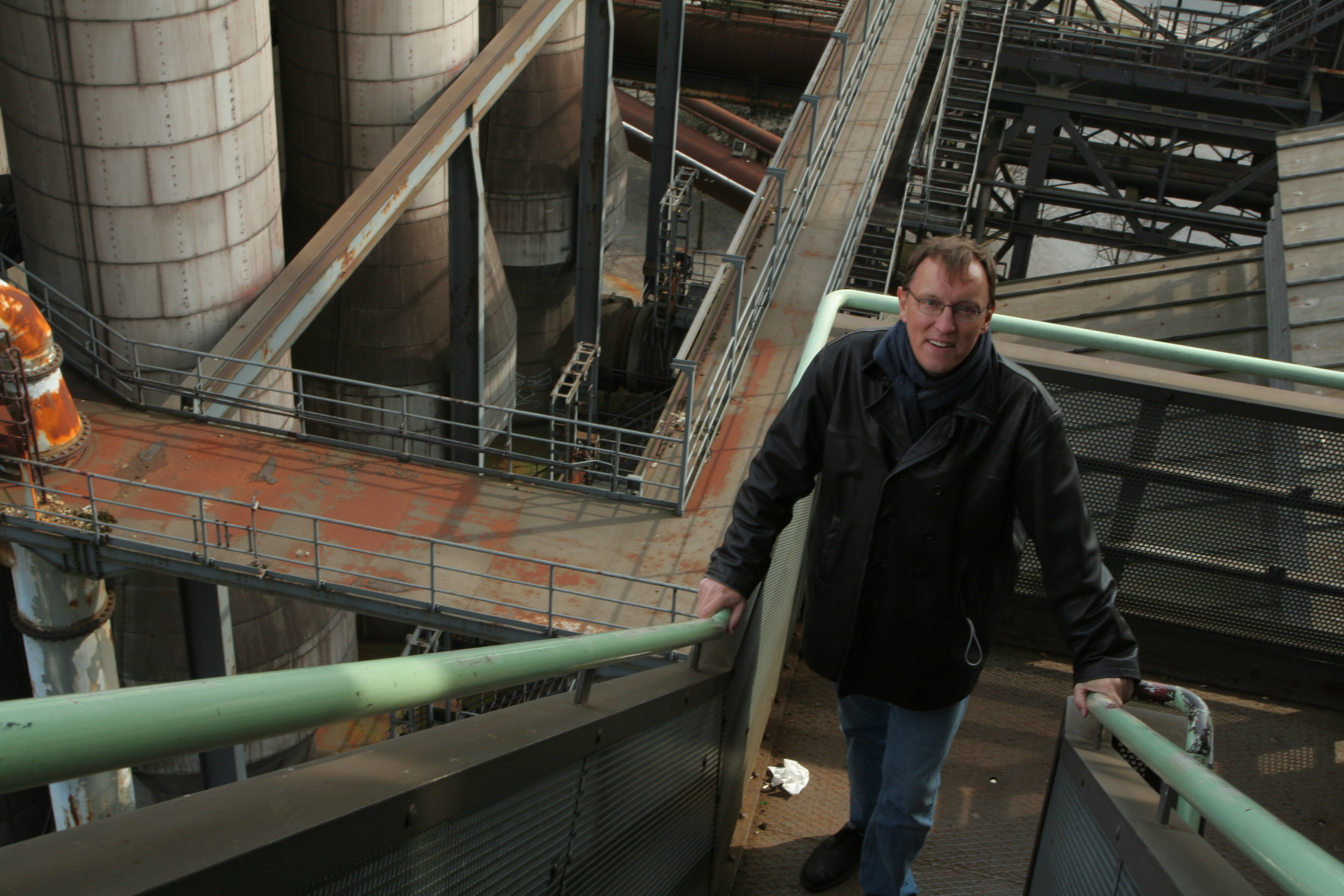

== Early life and education ==
He was born as Jörg Meyer, but he changed his surname to Meyer-Stamer during his early adulthood.

He completed a master's degree (Diplom-Politologue) in Political Science at the University of Hamburg between 1979 and 1986. He completed a doctoral degree in 1995 at the University of Hamburg, Faculty of Social Sciences.

Jörg was fluent in German, English, Portuguese and Spanish.

== Career ==
He started his career in 1987 with the Hamburg University Computer Science Department as a research officer studying the impact of office automation systems on white-collar workers. During this time he became a visiting fellow at the Institute of Latin American Research in Hamburg.

In 1988 he joined the German Development Institute/Deutsches Institut für Entwicklungspolitik (DIE/GDI) in Berlin as a fellow. He worked on industrial competitiveness, technological change, and private sector development. He had several research projects focused on Latin America. During this time he co-developed the framework of Systemic Competitiveness with Klaus Esser, Wolfgang Hillebrand and Dirk Messner. During his time at DIE/GDI he had several visiting fellowship appointments at other institutes such as Institute of Development Studies at the University of Sussex in Brighton (September to November 1994) and later at the Institut Arbeit und Technik, Gelsenkirchen, Germany (September to October 1996).

During his last two years at the DIE/GDI (1997 to 1998), Jörg was appointed as the head of teaching at the GDI/DIE with overall topical and organizational responsibility of the postgraduate course.

Following his death, the German Development Institute described Jörg as one of Germany's most creative and productive development researchers

In 1998, he joined the Institute for Development and Peace at the University of Duisburg. He led a project to assess and evaluate the overall performance of structural policy in North Rhine-Westphalia. During this time, he represented Germany on the United Nations Commission on Science and Technology for Development. He worked on a project with the Institute of Development Studies at the University of Sussex on the impact of global value chains on local clusters.

But Jörg felt constrained by the demands of the academic and research world, and in 2001 he ventured out as a freelance consultant. He maintained his links to his previous research networks but focused more on capacity building and method development in the developing world.

In 2003, he was a founding partner of the consultancy firm Mesopartner. Although he became a consultant, he continued to publish academic and research papers. As a consultant, his attention shifted more towards capacity building on experts and decision-makers in developing countries, especially on topics like local economic development, cluster promotion and innovation systems promotion.

== Work ==
Jorg worked in many developing countries to build local capacity, support local economic development and to advise governments and international development organisations like the Deutsche Gesellschaft für Internationale Zusammenarbeit, International Labour Organization and Inter-American Development Bank.

=== Systemic competitiveness ===
Together with Klaus Esser, Wolfgang Hillebrand, and Dirk Messner, Jörg Meyer-Stamer developed the concept of "systemic competitiveness". The DIE-GDI described the concept of systemic competitiveness as having a key impact on the discussion, both in Germany and internationally, on strategies suited to integrating developing countries into the world economy.

=== Local economic development ===
Jörg was a strong proponent of local economic development (LED). He was a vocal critic of planning driven LED approaches. He argued that a planning driven approach would sideline local stakeholders, and put the responsibility on the shoulder of local government. He claimed that LED is a learning approach and that this learning takes place as local stakeholders from different spheres work together to address local problems and opportunities. The strengthening of local trust and a focus on addressing local market failures was a theme throughout his work. He also suggested that a light touch approach focused on quick win activities is more suitable to start a local economic development process, and once the process is more mature and established a more planning driven approach involving more project management could be introduced.

The concepts Jörg developed have strongly influenced the work of international development organisations such as the Deutsche Gesellschaft für Internationale Zusammenarbeit and the Inter American Development Bank (IADB).

=== Participatory Appraisal of Competitive Advantage (PACA) ===
Jörg developed the Participatory Appraisal of Competitive Advantage (PACA) methodology. It is a participatory process methodology that enables local stakeholders to jointly diagnose and improve their local economy. A typical PACA exercise could be undertaken within a week or two. A PACA exercise combines interviews with local stakeholders and analytical workshops, and it aims to mobilise or draw in a diverse range of local stakeholders in the diagnosis. The exercise is concluded with a way-forward workshop where local stakeholders commit to implementing quick win activities to improve the local economy. The PACA methodology has been used in more than 30 countries including South Africa, Sri Lanka, Namibia, Ghana, Argentina, Vietnam, Indonesia and Thailand.

=== Rapid Appraisal of Local Innovation Systems (RALIS) ===
Jörg developed the RALIS methodology based on material developed for his doctoral thesis and his earlier work at the German Development Institute. He combined insights from the study of technological capability, the emerging field of innovation systems with his experience in local economic development. Whereas innovation systems are typically studied in an ex-post manner by scholars, RALIS was a participatory method that enabled stakeholders or champions within an innovation system to diagnose and improve their system in an ex-ante approach. His work was influenced by the work of Friedrich List, Christopher Freeman, Sanjaya Lall and Bengt-Ake Lundvall.

In 2005 Jörg co-authored a working paper with Christian Schoen that formalised the methodology.

== Books ==
Esser, K., Hillebrand, W., Messner, D. and Meyer-Stamer, J. 1996. Systemic Competitiveness. New Patterns for Industrial Development. London: Frank Cass.

Jörg Meyer-Stamer, Technology, Competitiveness and Radical Policy Change: The Case of Brazil (London and Portland, OR: Frank Cass, in association with the German Development Institute, 1997), pp. 336.

Giordano, P., Lazafame, F. and Meyer-Stamer, J. 2005. Asymmetries In Regional Integration and Local Development. Washington, D.C: Inter-American Development Bank.

== Book chapters ==
Meyer-Stamer, J. 2004. Paradoxes and ironies of locational policy in the new global economy. In Local enterprises in the global economy. Issues of governance and upgrading. Schmitz, H. (Ed.), Cheltenham: Edward Elgar, pp: 326–368.

Meyer-Stamer, J. 2005. Local Economic Development: What Makes It Difficult; What Makes It Work. In Asymmetries In Regional Integration and Local Development. Giordano, P., Lazafame, F. and Meyer-Stamer, J. (Eds.), Washington, D.C: Inter-American Development Bank.

Haar, J. and Meyer-Stamer, J. 2008. Small firms, global markets: challenges in the new economy. In Small firms, global markets: challenges in the new economy. Haar, J. and Meyer-Stamer, J. (Eds.), New York, NY: Palgrave Macmillan.

Meyer-Stamer, J. 2008. Systemic competitiveness and Local Economic Development. In Bodhanya, S.Large Scale Systemic Change: Theories, Modelling and Practices.

== Other publications ==
Meyer-Stamer, Jörg. 1998. Path dependence in regional development: persistence and change in three industrial clusters in Santa Catarina, Brazil. World Development, Vol. 268 pp. 1495-1511.

Meyer-Stamer, Jörg. and Wältring, Frank. 2000. Behind the Myth of Mittelstand Economy. The Institutional Environment Supporting Small and Medium-Sized Enterprises in Germany. INEF-Report 46/2000: INEF

Meyer-Stamer, Jörg., Maggi, Claudio. and Giese, Martin. 2004. Die Strukturkrise der Strukturpolitik : Tendenzen der Mesopolitik in Nordrhein-Westfalen. 1. Aufl. Wiesbaden: VS Verlag für Sozialwissenschaften.

Cunningham, Shawn. and Meyer-Stamer, Jörg. 2005. Planning or doing local economic development? Problems with the orthodox approach to LED. Africa Insight, 35(1).

Meyer-Stamer, Jörg. 2009. Modern industrial policy or postmodern industrial policy. Duisburg: Mesopartner and Freidrich Ebert Foundation.

== Working papers, reports and other publications ==
A list of his academic papers and books can be found on Researchgate.

A list of his working papers and concepts notes are available for free on the Mesopartner website
