= Neo-Schumpeterian economics =

School of thought emphasizing tech innovation

Neo-Schumpeterian economics is a school of thought that places technological innovation at the core of economic growth and transformation processes. It is inspired by the work of Joseph Schumpeter, who coined the term creative destruction for the continuous introduction of technological change that drives growth by replacing old, less productive structures with new, more productive ones. Where Schumpeter explained the innovation drive by an exogenous factor called entrepreneurial spirits, neo-Schumpeterian economists refer to endogenous factors such as science and technology policies and corporate strategies of research and development to explain innovation. Neo-Schumpeterian economics is a form of evolutionary economics and is closely related to innovation studies.

== History ==
In the aftermath of World War II, policymakers became increasingly convinced of the importance of science and technology policy. Quantitative research into the relation between economic growth and science and technology expenditures became a possibility with the global application of national accounts in the 1950s and the adoption in 1963 of the Frascati manual, an internationally accepted approach to measuring science and technology expenditures. In 1966, the Science Policy Research Unit (SPRU) was founded at the University of Sussex, which started a systematic and sustained research effort regarding long-term economic transformations and science and technology policy.

Christopher Freeman, who was involved in the development of the Frascati Manual and was the first director of SPRU, published in 1974 his seminal book "The economics of industrial innovation". Together with Richard Nelson and Bengt-Ake Lundvall he coined the concept of National innovation systems.

The international Joseph A. Schumpeter Society was founded in 1986 at the initiative of Wolfgang Stolper and Horst Hanusch. Since 1988 it has awarded the biennial Joseph A. Schumpeter award. In 1991 the Journal of Evolutionary Economics was founded that serves as a forum for the approach of economics in the tradition of Schumpeter.
