= Keith Pavitt =

British economist (1937–2002)

Keith Pavitt (13 January 1937, in London – 20 December 2002, in Lewes, East Sussex) was an English scholar in the field of Science and Technology Policy and Innovation Management. He was professor of Science and Technology Policy at the Science Policy Research Unit (SPRU) of the University of Sussex from 1984 to his death.

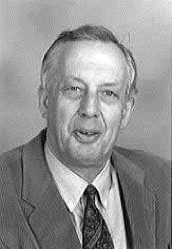
Keith Pavitt

== Biography ==
Keith Pavitt grew up in Hackney, London. In 1948 he graduated to Hackney Downs School (formerly The Grocers' Company's School). He won an Open Exhibition for Mathematics at Trinity College, Cambridge in the autumn of 1954. During National Service, he qualified as an RAF pilot. At Cambridge he obtained a First in Engineering in 1959 and was Senior Scholar at Trinity College. He won a fellowship in economics and public policy at Harvard University in 1960-1961. After leaving Harvard, Pavitt began research at the OECD on science and engineering-related public policy. After a year at Princeton University, Pavitt moved to Sussex University in 1971, becoming the Reginald Phillips Professor of Science and Technology Policy in 1984. He received a Laurea Honoris Causa from the Universidad Complutense de Madrid.

== Contributions to science and technology policy ==
Keith Pavitt pioneered new methods to measure innovation and technical change. Together with Pari Patel and Luc Soete, he developed the use of patents as a science and technology indicator. In the early 1980s, he also developed, together with Joe Townsend and other colleagues, a comprehensive database of innovations introduced in the UK since the end of the war. This database was used by several scholars and it is still a milestone in innovation measurement. Together with Roy Rothwell, he also developed the theory and practice of innovation management. As co-editor of academic journal Research Policy. He contributed to enhance its reputation to become the most influential publication in the field.

== Pavitt's taxonomy ==
The single most important contribution provided by Pavitt to the economics of innovation is his taxonomy of innovating firms. Pavitt argued that the sources and purposes of innovation are sector-specific. On the ground of an impressive knowledge of industrial innovation, Pavitt's Taxonomy suggests that firms can be divided into four broad categories: supplier dominated firms, i.e. those firms that acquire their technical expertise from their suppliers, specialised suppliers, especially in the field of equipment and capital goods, which provide the innovations to other firms, scale intensive firms, where the innovation is associated to scale, and science-based firms, which innovate through their internal R&D laboratories. In subsequent versions of his taxonomy, Pavitt added up also the category of information intensive firms, where the most important source to innovate is the use of data. These firms included firms in the software as well as in advanced services such as banking and retailing. Pavitt's Taxonomy has been widely applied in industrial economics and science policy and it is also used for industrial statistics. Originally developed for the manufacturing sector, is now increasingly applied also to the service economy.

== Legacy ==
Keith Pavitt was a crucial figure, together with his mentor Chris Freeman, to make SPRU a centre of international excellence in the field of innovation studies, with close collaboration with colleagues from all continents. He collaborated closely with Belgian economist Luc Soete, with Italian social scientist Giovanni Dosi, and he kept a strong intellectual link with the American economist Richard R. Nelson. A large number of papers were co-authored with the Indian economist Pari Patel. He also supervised and worked with several economists of innovation and science policy scholars, including Giorgio Sirilli, Ben Martin, Mike Hobday, Ian Miles, José Molero Zayas, Luigi Orsenigo, Daniele Archibugi, Jan Fagerberg, and Diana Hicks.

For his retirement, his colleagues organised a major Conference in honour of Keith Pavitt "What do we know about innovation?". Unexpectedly, Pavitt died several months before the Conference was held. The Conference became a major tribute to his life and works. The most important scholars in the field of science and technology policy attended it at SPRU, University of Sussex, on 12–15 November 2003,

The Library of the Science Policy Research Unit and the Laboratorio di Economia dell'Innovazione of the University of Florence are named after him.

== Works by Keith Pavitt ==
- Joe Tidd, John Bessant and Keith Pavitt, Managing Innovation: Integrating Technological, Market and Organizational Change, 3rd Edition, John Wiley, Hoboken, NJ, 2005, ISBN 0-470-09326-9
- Keith Pavitt, Technology, Management and Systems of Innovation, Edward Elgar, Cheltenham, 1999 ISBN 1-85898-874-8 (a collection of the most influential papers).
- Giovanni Dosi, Keith Pavitt, Luc Soete, The Economics of Technical Change and International Trade, New York University Press, New York, 1991, ISBN 0-8147-1834-5.
- Keith Pavitt, Sectoral patterns of technical change: Towards a taxonomy and a theory, "Research Policy", Volume 13, Issue 6, December 1984, Pages 343–373 .

== Works on Keith Pavitt ==
- Daniele Archibugi, "Pavitt's Taxonomy Sixteen Years on: A Review Article", Economics of Innovation and New Technology, vol. 3 (2001), pp. 415–425.
- Chris Freeman, Pari Patel and Ben Martin, Professor Keith Pavitt. Pioneer in science policy research. Obituary, the Independent, 31 January 2003.
- Martin Meyer, Tiago Santos Pereirac, Olle Persson and Ove Granstrand, "The Scientometric World of Keith Pavitt: A Tribute to his contributions to Research Policy and Patent Analysis", Research Policy, Vol. 33, no. 9 (2004), pages 1405–1417.
- Bart Verspagen and Claudia Werker, "Keith Pavitt and the Invisible College of the Economics of Technology and Innovation", Research Policy. Vol. 33, no. 9 (2004), pages: 1419–1431
