= Corporate language policy =

Corporate language policy is a broad category covering the internal governance and management of language in private organisations. This differs from other definitions, such as official language and working language, as this category considers a broader set of organisational policy and actions directed towards language.

== Definition from research ==
Corporate language policy as a label stems from various sub-disciplines of international business and management and business communication research. The streams of research have investigated how multinational companies (MNC) address multilingualism when their business activities cross borders or they have a workforce speaking several languages. Apart from the central issue of choosing the official language/s of the company, other internal regulations may exist to support the language decision. Corporate language policy can therefore be an umbrella term covering the company language choice and other language-related measures, such as recruitment criteria, employee training and courses and internal communication principles.

== Background and relevance ==
One central background factor in corporate language policy is the multilingual nature of workplaces often found in international corporations. Being an international corporation does not necessarily equal being multilingual, like being a domestic corporation does not automatically equal monolingualism. Still, many companies in open economies do encounter multilingualism in one form or another. The internationalisation of companies involves operating in several markets which might not share a language, requiring companies to use multiple languages for daily operations. International recruitment is another factor which has been found to lead to multilingual workforces. Corporations tend to recruit employees internationally in order to secure talent not available within one single national labour market.

Existing international business and management research has documented several potential implications of multilingual workplaces. When employees do not share first languages, and even though they are proficient in a common language, such as English, there is a chance that communication will occur on unequal terms. In some cases, material or communication could come from the central parts of the corporation, but need translation and create expensive bottlenecks when being transferred to a subsidiary in another country.

== English as a corporate language ==
Corporate language policies have been suggested and implemented in practice as a solution to the challenges of a multilingual corporate landscape. In order to create a common ground for communication between employees and comply with the influential role of English as a business lingua franca in international business, many corporations have chosen English as their official language. This policy choice can appear in several forms. Besides having chosen a common language, corporations may choose whether the mandate applies for internal or external communication, verbal or written communication, or whether it applies to all employees in all departments in all situations. While English is a frequent corporate language choice in international settings, other major languages or national languages are frequently chosen as well, depending on the context. Corporate language policy may also use several official languages in parallel, or even allow functional multilingualism, where employees may use their preferred language when suitable.

Research on English corporate language policies has found that, although creating a clear framework for communication in multilingual workplaces, there are challenges with creating policies for language use. One frequently reported scenario in research is when the language proficiency of employees does not match the corporate language policy. Imbalanced relations may form, where employees more proficient in the corporate language gain advantages through more proficient communication or higher standing deriving from their language skills. Employees have also been reported to avoid situations where they feel their low corporate language skills are particularly exposed. A key dilemma in corporate language choice is whether to aim for global standardisation through one single language, or adaptation to local contexts through multiple languages.

== Relevance of corporate language in human resources (HR) ==
Corporate HR practices are often relevant to corporate language policy and may even be considered a part of the language strategy. Two central topics are language-sensitive recruitment and language training. Recruiting employees based on their proficiency in the corporate language/s has been suggested as one way of shaping a workforce with a desired linguistic profile. Language classes have also been suggested as an HR tool which can improve the capabilities of existing employees to fit the corporate language policy. However, researchers have also encouraged HR departments to go beyond these two tools when addressing language in the company.

== See also ==
- Working language
