= CENTRIM =

The Centre for Research in Innovation Management (CENTRIM), at University of Brighton, was a multidisciplinary research group that originated in the 1980s.

CENTRIM offered a postgraduate student program, Knowledge Transfer Partnerships and a range of product and services.

Back in 2003 CENTRIM and Science and Technology Policy Research moved to the purpose-built Freeman Centre on the University of Sussex campus. CENTRIM was then joined at Freeman Centre by members of the Economic and Social Engagement department at University of Brighton.

In August 2010, as part of University-wide improvements to organisation of faculties, CENTRIM joined forces with the School of Business and Law. In early 2013 CENTRIM moved to 154 Edward Street, Brighton.

The 2014 Research Excellence Framework (REF) recognised CENTRIM as a leading research institution, with 92 per cent of its research rated as either internationally excellent, internationally recognised or world-leading.

The core of CENTRIM's being is the acquisition of knowledge and its distribution to all.

CENTRIM was discontinued in 2023.

== List of staff past and present ==
- Prof John Bessant
- Prof Howard Rush
- Prof Steve Flowers
- Prof Tim Brady
- Prof Mike Hobday
- Dr Dave Francis
- Dr Andrew Grantham
- Dr George Tsekouras
- Despina Kanellou
- Dr Nick Marshall
- Paul Levy
- David Knowles
- Graham Perrin
- Dr Jose Christian
- Dr Aline Figlioli
- Prof Jonathan Sapsed
- Dr Jeff Readman
- Dr Yolande Cooke
- Juan Mateos-Garcia
- Eugenia Aguilar-Nova
- Prof Bob Sang
