= Research Policy (journal) =

Academic Journal

- Discipline: Science and technology studies
- Language: English
- Edited by: Ben Martin, Maria Savona, Anna Bergek, Alex Coad, Maryann Feldman, Elisa Giuliani, Adam B. Jaffe, Martin Kenney, Keun Lee, Kazuyuki Motohashi, Paul Nightingale, Ammon Salter, John Walsh

Publication details
- History: 1971–present
- Publisher: Elsevier
- Frequency: Monthly
- Open access: Hybrid
- Impact factor: 8.9 (2025)

Standard abbreviations
- ISO 4: Res. Policy

Indexing
- ISSN: 0048-7333 (print); 1873-7625 (web)
- LCCN: 72624486
- OCLC no.: 39166783

Links
- Journal homepage; Online access; Online archive

Research Policy is a monthly peer-reviewed academic journal published by Elsevier on behalf of the Science Policy Research Unit at the University of Sussex. It was established by British economist Christopher Freeman in 1971 and is regarded as the leading journal in the field of innovation studies. It is listed as one of the top 50 journals used by the Financial Times to compile its global business school research rankings.

== Content ==
The journal covers a wide range of subjects such as technological change, R&D, management of knowledge, entrepreneurship, science policy, and multiple subfields relating to innovation studies (e.g., innovation economics, innovation management, technology innovation). It is a top-ranked or top-cited journal in the fields of business and economics, management, technology and innovation management (TIM), academic entrepreneurship, and technology assessment.

== History ==
Based on research conducted by Joseph Schumpeter, Freeman worked to demonstrate the importance of innovation and R&D for economic development. From 1959 to 1966, Freeman worked at the National Institute of Economic and Social Research, where he carried out pioneering studies on industrial research. He played an important role in the development of the OECD's Frascati Manual. In 1966, Freeman founded the Science Policy Research Unit and became its first director. It became a global hub for innovation research and attracted scholars from across the world. Research Policy was established in 1971 with Freeman as editor-in-chief. In 1984, Keith Pavitt succeeded Freeman as the R.M. Phillips Professor of Science Policy and as the main editor of the journal, a post he would hold until his retirement in 2002.

Research Policy: X was Research Policy's open access mirror journal that was discontinued in 2021.

== Abstracting and indexing ==
The journal is indexed and abstracted in the following bibliographic databases:

- Compendex
- Current Contents
- EBSCO databases
- EconLit
- International Bibliography of Periodical Literature
- Inspec
- International Bibliography of the Social Sciences
- ProQuest databases
- Social Sciences Citation Index
- Scopus

According to the Journal Citation Reports, the journal has a 2025 impact factor of 8.9.

== Notable studies ==
Notable studies published in the journal include:

- Krauch, Helmut (1971). "Priorities for research and technological development". Research Policy. 1 (1): 28–39. doi:10.1016/0048-7333(71)90005-9.
- Martin, Ben R.; Irvine, John (April 1983). "Assessing basic research: Some partial indicators of scientific progress in radio astronomy". Research Policy. 12 (2): 61–90. doi:10.1016/0048-7333(83)90005-7.
- Narin, Francis; Hamilton, Kimberly S.; Olivastro, Dominic (October 1997). "The increasing linkage between U.S. technology and public science". Research Policy. 26 (3): 317–330. doi:10.1016/S0048-7333(97)00013-9.
- Martin, Ben R. (February 2016). "Editors' JIF-boosting stratagems – Which are appropriate and which not?" (PDF). Research Policy. 45 (1): 1–7. doi:10.1016/j.respol.2015.09.001.
- Levecque, Katia; Anseel, Frederik; De Beuckelaer, Alain; Van der Heyden, Johan; Gisle, Lydia (May 2017). "Work organization and mental health problems in PhD students". Research Policy. 46 (4): 868–879. doi:10.1016/j.respol.2017.02.008. hdl:2066/175885. S2CID 31646576.
