= Sandner =

Sandner is a surname. Notable people with the surname include:

- David Sandner, American writer
- Jack Sandner (1941–2021), American businessman
- Olaf Sandner (1923–2013), Venezuelan fencer
- Philipp Sandner (born 1980), German economist
- Willi Sandner (1911–1984), German speed skater
- Wolfgang Sandner (1949–2015), German physicist

== See also ==
- Gertrude Fröhlich-Sandner (1926–2008), Austrian politician
