= Pipers Crisps =

British potato crisp brand

- Product type: Potato crisps
- Current owner: PepsiCo
- Country: England
- Introduced: 2004
- Website: www.piperscrisps.com

Pipers Crisps is a British brand of potato crisps, launched in 2004 by Alex Albone, Simon Herring and James Sweeting. Its factory is located near Brigg in North Lincolnshire. Initially, the company sold to local outlets, including pubs and cafés, and to independent retailers. It deliberately avoided major supermarket chains.

In February 2019, PepsiCo, which also owns the Walkers brand, acquired Pipers Crisps following approval by the Competition and Markets Authority. The purchase price was not disclosed. The Grocer reported that it was approximately £20 million.

== History ==
=== Foundation and development ===
Pipers Crisps Limited was incorporated on 12 December 2003. The business began operations in April 2004. Albone, Herring and Sweeting all came from farming backgrounds.

Initially, Pipers sold to local outlets. It used locally grown potatoes and sunflower oil, with flavouring ingredients sourced from other regions of Britain and overseas. For example, cheddar came from Somerset, sea salt from Anglesey and chillies from Bedfordshire.

Albone said independent retailers benefited from stocking Pipers because its products were unavailable in major supermarkets. He also argued that relying on a large supermarket customer could expose a small manufacturer to financial risk.

In January 2013, The Yorkshire Post reported that Pipers had recorded turnover of £4.2 million in the previous year, following a 31 per cent increase in sales. At that time, its products were available in approximately 5,000 outlets, including pubs, sandwich shops, garden centres and farm shops. The company had 48 employees and six delivery vans. It had switched to round-the-clock production to keep up with demand.

In the financial year ending 31 January 2018, sales increased by 16.3 per cent to £11.4 million. The company supplied independent retailers and foodservice customers in the United Kingdom and almost 40 other countries.

=== Acquisition by PepsiCo ===
In 2017, Pipers appointed corporate finance advisers Spayne Lindsay to consider its options, including a sale. In November 2018, PepsiCo announced its proposed acquisition of Pipers, subject to approval by competition regulators.

The Competition and Markets Authority examined the companies' activities in foodservice, major grocery retailers and smaller retail outlets. Its report put Pipers' annual turnover at £11.4 million, of which £10.4 million came from the United Kingdom.

On 30 January 2019, the authority cleared the takeover. It concluded that the businesses were not close competitors and would continue to face sufficient competition after the acquisition.

PepsiCo announced completion on 4 February 2019. It said that Pipers would continue to focus on pubs, restaurants, cafés, hotels and farm shops in the United Kingdom and internationally.

=== Further developments ===
In September 2019, Pipers Crisps Limited recalled specified batches of Anglesey Sea Salt and Karnataka Black Pepper crisps as a precaution because of possible contamination with Listeria monocytogenes. The notice said that no other Pipers products were known to be affected.

On 15 May 2024, PepsiCo announced an £8 million investment in the Brigg factory. Improvements would include replacement fryers, new packaging equipment and upgrades to facilities for approximately 100 employees. PepsiCo said the investment would increase production capacity by nearly 80 per cent.

By this time, the distribution network included national wholesalers such as Booker, Bidfood and Brakes, as well as hospitality operators. PepsiCo identified further exports as an objective of the factory investment.

== Products and production ==
Pipers produces batch-cooked potato crisps. Early products included black pepper and sea salt, cheddar and onion, cider vinegar and sea salt, sweet chilli and an unsalted variety. Packaging identified the producers or places associated with particular flavouring ingredients.

In 2018, Pipers launched Crispeas, a range of pea-based snacks. The launch flavours were English Mint, Salsa Verde and Matar Paneer, the latter named after the Indian dish made with peas and cheese.

=== Research and development ===
Pipers undertook a Knowledge Transfer Partnership with the University of Nottingham, supported by Innovate UK. The collaboration involved food scientist Deepa Agarwal and academic adviser Ian Fisk. The research focused on flavour and storage stability, as well as the effects of different cooking conditions.

The work included analysing flavour compounds, changing cooking temperatures and times, and establishing a trained tasting panel drawn from employees. Agarwal also helped develop a wild thyme and rosemary flavour. According to Food Manufacture, changes to the production process increased shelf life from 28 to 40 weeks, helping the company enter new export markets.

The university's Research Excellence Framework case study described work on frying oils, nitrogen-flushed packaging and seasonings. It reported that Pipers had applied the findings to reduce sodium levels and ingredient costs while improving storage stability and flavour.

== Packaging and branding ==
In January 2012, BrandOpus introduced a new identity using the name Pipers Crisp Co. The design replaced photography-led packaging with a more prominent wordmark and piper character. Different colours identified the flavours. Packaging retained information about the origins of ingredients and carried the phrase "Made by Farmers".

The redesign won a gold award in the food producers category of the Design Business Association's 2016 Design Effectiveness Awards.

Another redesign in 2018 gave the piper character greater prominence and accompanied the launch of Crispeas. The project won a bronze award at the 2020 Design Effectiveness Awards.
