= STEPS Centre =

Research Center

The STEPS Centre (Social, Technological and Environmental Pathways to Sustainability) was an interdisciplinary research centre hosted at the University of Sussex, funded by the Economic and Social Research Council. The Centre's research brought together development studies with science and technology studies. It was founded at Portcullis House in London on 25 June 2007. It closed in 2022.

== History ==
The STEPS Centre (Social, Technological and Environmental Pathways to Sustainability) was an interdisciplinary research centre that was founded at Portcullis House in London on 25 June 2007. It was hosted by the Institute of Development Studies and the Science Policy Research Unit at the University of Sussex. It was funded by the Economic and Social Research Council.

The STEPS Centre described its aim as to "highlight, reveal and contribute to just and democratic pathways to sustainability that include the needs, knowledge and perspectives of poor and marginalised people". The Centre's research combined development studies with science and technology studies.

Professors Ian Scoones and Andy Stirling were the co-directors of the STEPS Centre. Professor Melissa Leach stepped down as STEPS director in 2014 to become the Director of the Institute of Development Studies. The centre closed in 2022.

== Areas of work ==
The STEPS Centre's research investigated the politics of sustainability in various domains, including climate change, food systems, urbanization, and technology. It focused on the perspectives and needs of marginalized people, particularly in poor countries and settings, as well as methodologies for including these priorities in policy appraisal and decision-making. In the final four years of its research program, the STEPS Centre focused on a series of themes with implications for the politics of sustainability.

Among the STEPS Centre's projects were:

- Innovation, Sustainability, Development: A New Manifesto (40 years on from the Sussex Manifesto)
- Crop, disease and innovation in Kenya - Maize and farming system dynamics in areas affected by climate change
- Urbanisation in Asia - urbanisation and sustainability on the expanding peri-urban fringe of Delhi, India
- Rethinking regulation - assumptions and realities of drug and seed regulation in China and Argentina
- Risk, uncertainty and technology - framing and responses to risks and uncertainties in areas of rapid scientific and technological advance
- Epidemics, livelihoods and politics - HIV-AIDS, SARS, 'avian flu, BSE - procedures for addressing epidemics that support rather than compromise poor people

== Pathways approach ==
The STEPS Centre's pathways approach to understanding dynamic systems and their governance was outlined in a 2007 paper entitled Pathways to Sustainability: an Overview of the STEPS Centre Approach. The paper laid out the ingredients of the STEPS Centre's work, including linking diverse social and natural science perspectives, connecting theory, policy and practice and an engaged, interactive approach to communications.
