= Brighton Business School =

Coordinates: 50.8421°N 0.1194°W

University of Brighton School of Business and Law
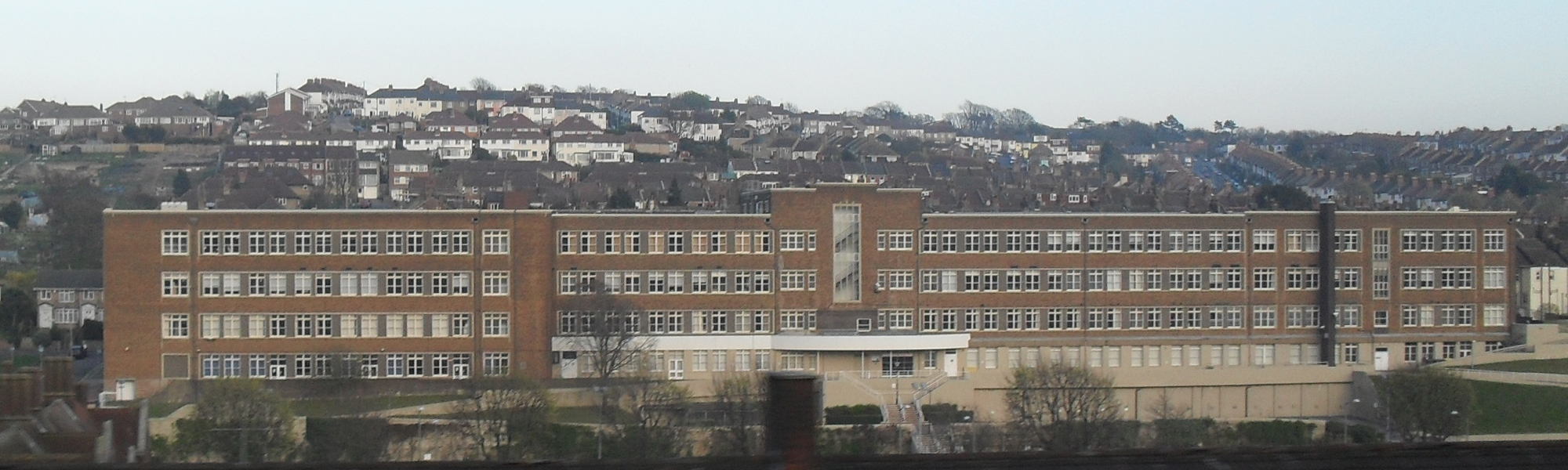
- Type: Business School
- Established: 1986
- Affiliations: University of Brighton
- Location: Brighton, England
- Website: www.brighton.ac.uk/bbs

The School of Business and Law is part of the University of Brighton. It offers undergraduate and postgraduate degrees. The school has approximately 500 full-time students, 1,000 part-time students, and 120 academic staff members. It provides teaching, research, and consulting services in various fields, including accounting, economics, finance, business, human resources, management, marketing, and law.

Formerly part of Brighton Technical College, the school has been teaching business and management courses since the 1960s. It is located in Elm House on the Moulsecoomb campus, two kilometres from Brighton's city centre.

The school offers a number of accredited degrees, which lead to some exemptions from professional examinations. Professional bodies affiliated with the school include the Association of Chartered Certified Accountants, the Chartered Institute of Management Accountants, the Chartered Institute of Personnel and Development, the Chartered Institute of Purchasing and Supply, the Chartered Management Institute, the Institute of Chartered Accountants in England and Wales, and the Law Society.

The School of Business and Law has hosted two research centres: the Centre for Research in Innovation Management (CENTRIM) and the Centre for Research on Management and Employment (CROME). In the 2008 Research Assessment Exercise, it was ranked as one of the top 15 UK business schools in terms of world-leading research outputs. 70% of the school's business and management research was found to be of international standing or higher.
