= Arius Raposas =

Filipino historian

Arius Lauren Raposas
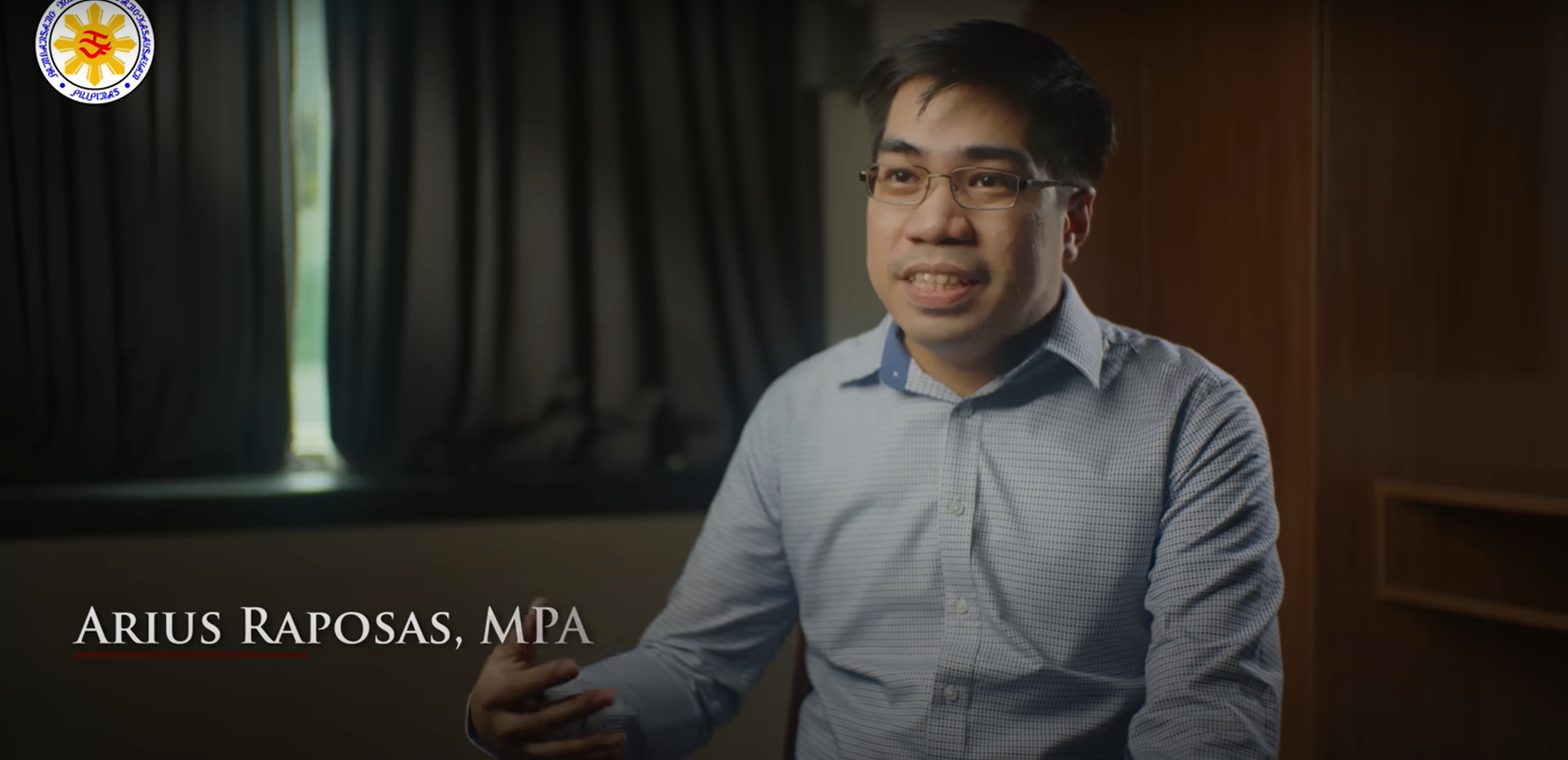
- Born: January 1, 1996; Marikina, Metro Manila
- Other name: Al Raposas
- Citizenship: Philippines
- Education: University of the Philippines Diliman
- Occupations: Historian; Political scientist; Public servant; Writer
- Awards: Parangal ng Gintong Pluma; Influencer of the Year for Filipino History 2025; Icons of Change 2025; Dangal ng Lahi Award; Natatanging Bayaning Pilipino sa Larangan ng Kasaysayan; Natatanging Pilipino na Naglilingkod sa Tao at sa Bayan; Top Performing and Most Trusted Public Servant and Historian in the Philippines; 2026 International Literary Award for Author of the Year; Charles Dickens Medal for Literary Excellence; Mega Golden Quill Award; Philippine Public Service Leadership Award; Asian Pillars Award

Arius Raposas (born January 1, 1996) is a Filipino historian, political scientist, public servant, and writer. Besides having academic works on history, political science, economics and business, international relations, and public administration, he maintains a history website known as the Filipino Historian. Raposas has served in the executive and the legislative branches of the Philippine government.

== Early life and education ==
Raposas has been involved in public service since at least 2000, notably with the Boy Scouts of the Philippines. He has also served in various volunteering and leadership activities. As a student leader, Raposas cautioned on decreasing democratic participation and waning leadership generation among the youth as a potential troubling sign for the future of public administration and governance, while proposing innovative solutions to address the issues.

In 2010, he ranked 3rd in the National Achievement Test. Raposas obtained his bachelor's degree in history from the University of the Philippines, graduating as magna cum laude. In recognition of his academic achievements, he was inducted as a member of Pi Gamma Mu and the Honor Society of Phi Kappa Phi. He also earned a master's degree in public administration from the same university.

== Career ==
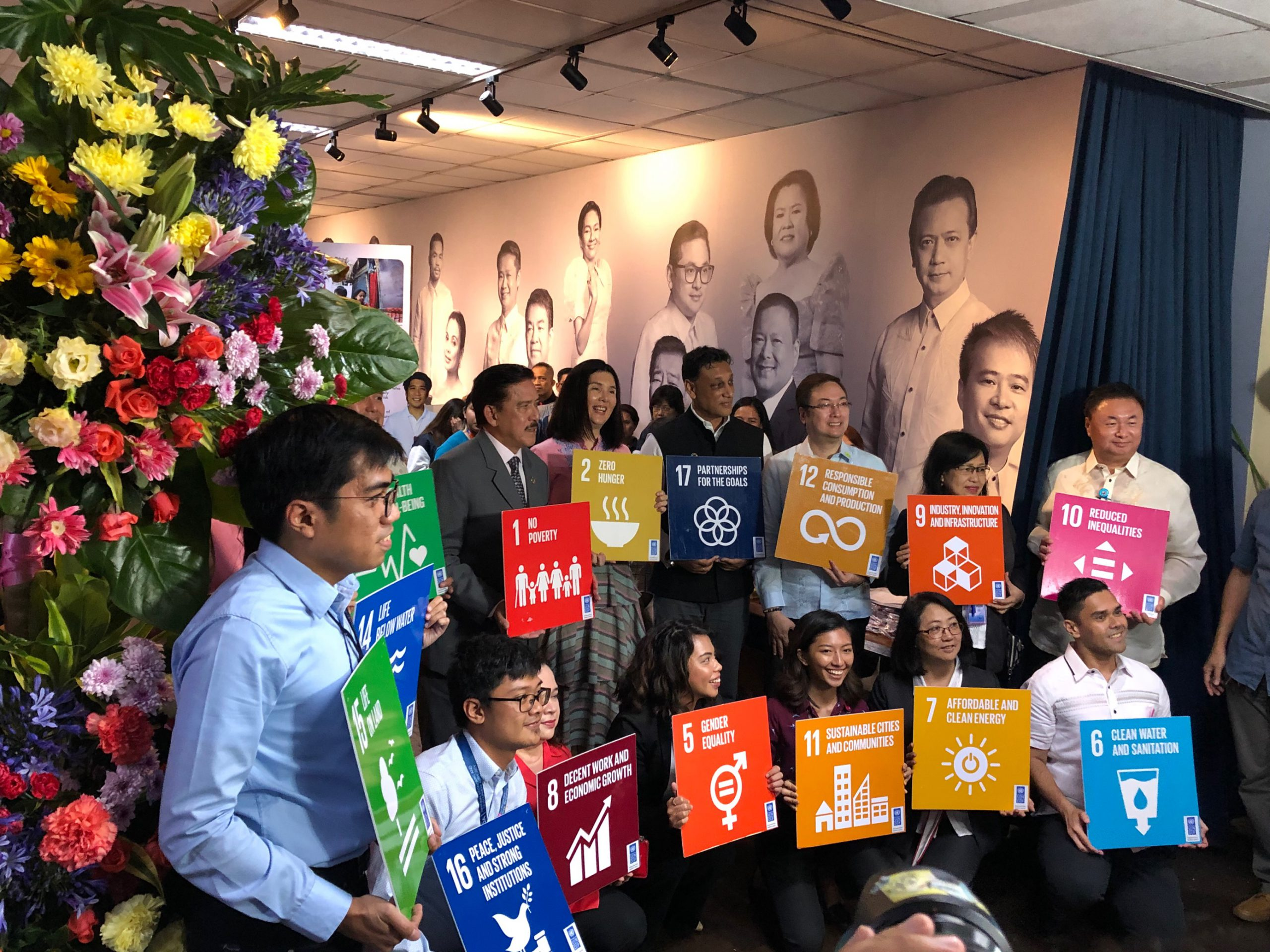
Raposas, far left (holding placard for Sustainable Development Goal 15), during a ceremony at the Senate of the Philippines.

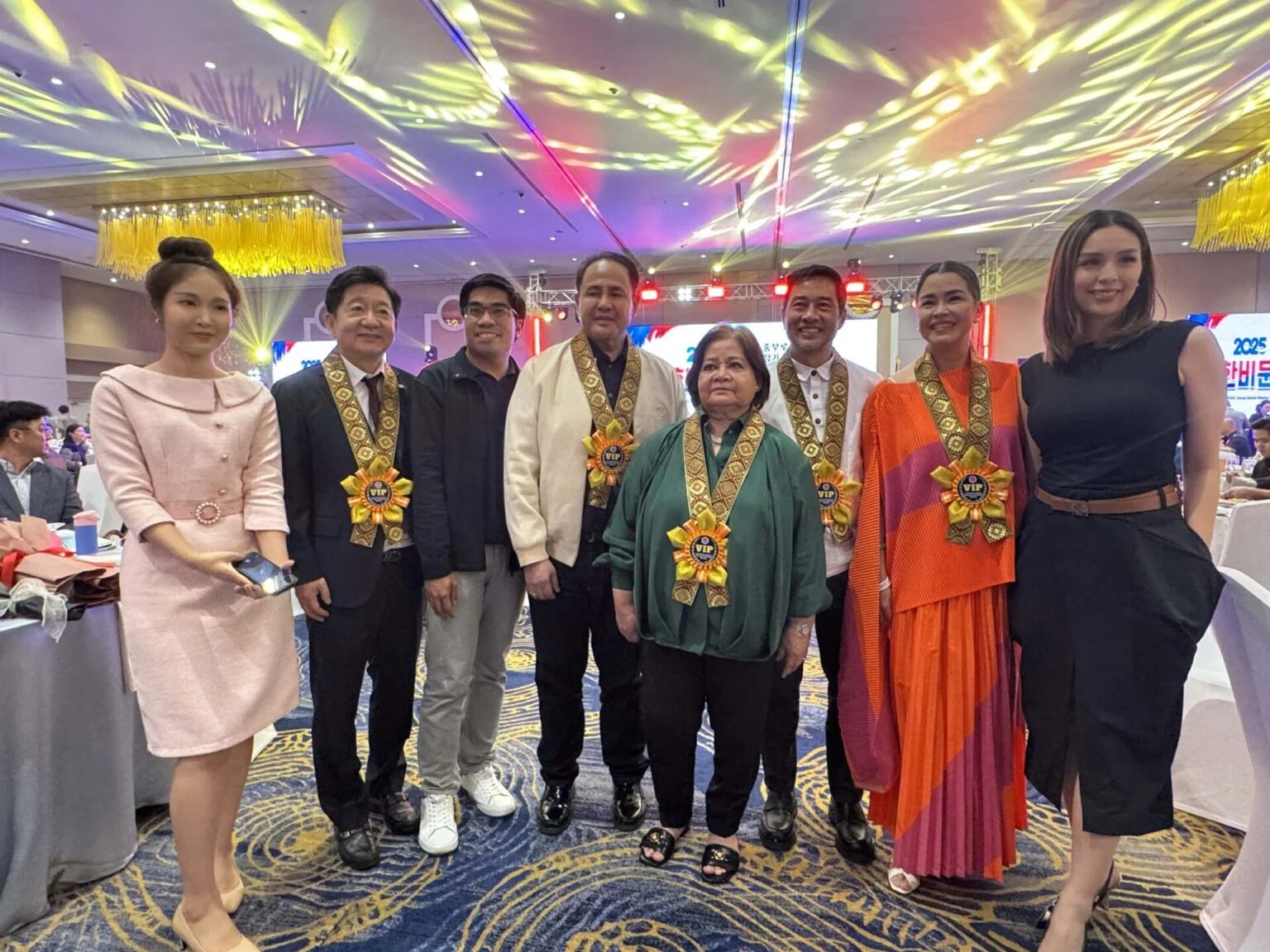
Raposas, third from left, during the 2025 Hanbi Cultural Festival of the Korean community in the Philippines.

Raposas began the platform called Filipino Historian as an open access history and culture website in 2012, consistently ranking as one of the top blogging websites in the Philippines. In 2015, it was nominated for the Society and Politics category in Bloggys: the Philippine Blogging Awards. In 2021, it was included in the Curated Collection of Archaeology Blogs organized by the University of the Philippines Archaeological Studies Program Library. The website claims to reach an average of 1 million people per day across various online channels as of 2022. In 2025, it claims to have reached a cumulative of over 1 billion people in more than 100 nations, solidifying his position as one of the more recognized Filipino historians in the world. Web analytics service Similarweb, meanwhile, ranks the website in the Top 500 of Websites Ranking for Dictionaries and Encyclopedias in the Philippines (102 as of July 2026). Its affiliate movement History, Civics, and Culture Philippines has around 10,000 members.

His media appearances began in 2014, where the local media has popularized the moniker of him being "the nation's youngest historian" due to his relatively young age when he first appeared on national television. Among the networks he has been featured in include Arte TV, RED FM Canada, CNN Philippines, GTV 27, GMA 7, TV 5, PTV 4, IBC 13, ABS-CBN, Net 25, UNTV, Bombo Radyo Philippines, Radyo Pilipinas, The Independent, Pittsburgh Post-Gazette, Philippine Daily Inquirer, Philippine Star, SunStar, SMNI, DZAR, DZUP, and Malaya. Besides his work with mainstream media outlets, he also maintains a podcast.

In 2023, Raposas was one of the experts featured in the docufilm Gomburza produced by the National Historical Commission of the Philippines. The documentary was released as part of the 150th anniversary of the execution of the three Filipino priests (Mariano Gomes, Jose Burgos, Jacinto Zamora) collectively called Gomburza.

For his contributions in mainstream and digital media, Raposas was nominated as one of the Ten Outstanding Young Filipino Influencers (TOYFI) for 2024, an award organized by the Rotary Club and Junior Chamber International, and was recognized as Influencer of the Year Award for Filipino History at the Influencers Watchlist 2025.

In 2025, Raposas was a nominee for The Outstanding Young Men of the Philippines (TOYM). In addition, Raposas was named one of the "Icons of Change" for Sustainable Development Goal 15, and as "Exemplary Young Public Servant and Outstanding Housing Advocate of the Year" by the Dangal ng Lahi Award. He was also recognized by the Gawad Pilipino Awards as Natatanging Bayaning Pilipino sa Larangan ng Kasaysayan (Distinguished Filipino Hero in the Discipline of History) and Natatanging Pilipino na Naglilingkod sa Tao at sa Bayan (Distinguished Filipino Public Servant). He was recognized as the Top Performing and Most Trusted Public Servant and Historian in the Philippines by the 2026 Media People's Choice Awards.

Raposas is one of the editorial board members of the International Journal of Academic and Practical Research. Besides his major areas of expertise, Raposas was also known to have engaged with research in energy, technology, and religion.

His literary works involved various genres, including historical fiction, romantic comedy, fantasy, mystery, science fiction, and poetry. In 2022, he had the distinction of becoming the first Filipino writer to be featured by the US-based program The Authors Show. In the literary field, Raposas was recognized in the 2026 International Literary Awards as Author of the Year, where his citation included him being "an experienced civil servant and one of the most influential historians in the Philippines." He was also conferred the Charles Dickens Medal for Literary Excellence, and Mega Golden Quill Award. In addition, he won the Parangal ng Gintong Pluma in 2024, and was also a finalist for the 2021 Lampara Prize in both the New Adult and the Young Adult categories.

He has also displayed his prowess as a translator and a comics creator. Since 2003, he produced at least 30 different comic titles. In 2022, Raposas was a finalist of the Timpalak Mario I. Miclat sa Pagsasalin, organized by the Filipinas Institute of Translation (FIT) to translate the Japanese novel Kokoro.

As of 2025-2026, Raposas is ranked 3rd in Business & Management / Public Administration by AD Scientific Index among scientists from the University of the Philippines according to h-index.
