= Giorgio Sirilli =

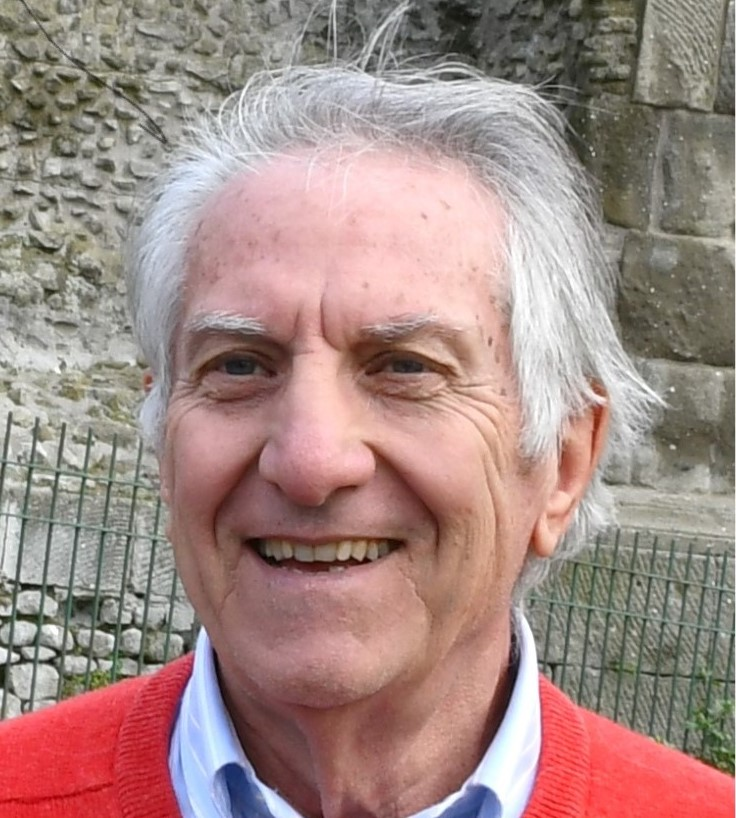
Giorgio Sirilli

Giorgio Sirilli (born in 1949 in Albano Laziale) is an Italian scholar in the field of science and technology policy.

== Biography ==
After graduating in economics from the University of Rome "La Sapienza," Giorgio Sirilli conducted research at the Science Policy Research Unit at Sussex University in England, working with notable scholars Christopher Freeman and Keith Pavitt. He also carried out research at the Organisation for Economic Co-operation and Development (OECD).

Sirilli was a Research director of the National Research Council of Italy and Professor of economics and management of innovation at various Italian universities, including LUISS, Tor Vergata University, and Unitelma. As chairman of the OECD Group of National Experts on Science and Technology Indicators (NESTI), he contributed to the development and revision of several important statistical manuals, such as the Frascati Manual on R&D, the Oslo Manual on Technological and Organizational Innovation, the Canberra Manual on Human Resources for Science and Technology, and the Patents Manual.

He is the author of over 220 scientific publications. He is a co-author of the Dictionary of the Albanense Dialect.

Il 1999 he served as the councillor for budget and planning of the Municipality of Albano Laziale, his home city. He plays a role in the political life in Albano Laziale and, more generally, in the area of Castelli Romani.

He publishes regurarly articles in the on-line journal www.controluce.it. He is the author of various books on the cultural, historical and political life of Albano Laziale as well as statistical analyses of the city.

== Recent Publications ==
- Sirilli G., Homo Albanensis, Edizioni Controluce, Montecompatri, gennaio 2026, ISBN 979-12-80402-90-5
- Sirilli G., La popolazione di Albano Laziale e dei Castelli Romani – 2025, luglio 2025, Torregiani e Frezzotti.
- Sirilli G., Albano Laziale e i Castelli Romani attraverso la statistica - 2022, Edizioni Controluce, Montecompatri, marzo 2022, ISBN 979-12-80402-16-5
- Sirilli G., Prediche inutili. Analisi e proposte inascoltate dai politici, Edizioni Controluce, Montecompatri, maggio 2022, ISBN 979-12-80402- 21-9
- Sirilli G., Albano Laziale e i Castelli Romani attraverso la statistica – 2022, Edizioni Controluce, Montecompatri, febbraio 2022, ISBN 979-12-80402- 16-5
- Sirilli G., I Castelli Romani attraverso la statistica, Castelli Romani, Anno LX, marzo/aprile 2020
- Sirilli G., Albano Laziale. Il paese nella memoria del Comune, Albano Laziale, Torregiani e Frezzotti, giugno 2019
- Sirilli G., Albano Laziale. Il paese nella memoria degli anziani, Albano Laziale, Torregiani e Frezzotti, ISBN 979-12-200-3342-8, aprile 2018
- Sirilli G., Indagine statistica sul dialetto ad Albano Laziale ed in alcuni Comuni dei Castelli Romani, Castelli Romani, Anno LXII, settembre/ottobre 2017, pagg. 131-144
- Dori N., Onorati A., Sirilli G., Torregiani, Vocabolario del dialetto albanense (con prefazione di Tullio De Mauro), 2° Edizione rivista e aggiornata, Frezzotti e Torregiani, Albano Laziale, 2014
- Giuffrida S., Silvani A., Sirilli G. Research Evaluation of the Italian CNR Institutes: A Missed Opportunity? ISSiRFA, Rome, January 2011.
- Sirilli G. Science and Technology Indicators: Challenges of the Next Decade. In Albornoz M. (ed.) Agenda 2011. Temas de Indicadores de Ciencia y Tecnología, RICYT, Buenos Aires, 2011.
- Sirilli G. et al. The MEADOW Guidelines, MEADOW Consortium, Paris, 2010.
- Sirilli G. (ed.) La Produzione e la Diffusione della Conoscenza. Ricerca, Innovazione e Risorse Umane, Fondazione CRUI, Rome, July 2010. ISBN 978-88-96524-02-2
- Perani G., Sirilli G. La Dimensione Regionale della Ricerca e dell'Innovazione, Quinto Rapporto Annuale sullo Stato del Regionalismo-2008, Milano, Giuffrè, 2008.
- Sirilli G., Tuzi F. An Evaluation of Government-Financed R&D Projects in Italy, Research Evaluation, vol. 18, no. 2, June 2009, pp. 163–172.
- Sirilli G. Innovazione Tecnologica, Enciclopedia della Scienza e della Tecnica, vol. V, pp. 311–322, Rome, Istituto della Enciclopedia Italiana, 2008.
- AA. VV. La Valutazione della Ricerca. Libro Bianco, Consiglio Italiano per le Scienze Sociali, Marsilio, Venice, 2006.
- Sirilli G. Ricerca e Sviluppo, Il Mulino, Bologna, 2005.
- Silvani A., Sirilli G., Tuzi F. R&D Evaluation in Italy: More Needs to Be Done, Research Evaluation, vol. 14, no. 3, December 2005, pp. 207–215.
- Sirilli G., Innovazione tecnologica, Voce dell’Enciclopedia del Novecento, Istituto della Enciclopedia Italiana fondata da Giovanni Treccani, III Supplemento, Vol. XIII, pp. 44-53, 2004.
