= Sussex Manifesto =

The Sussex Manifesto was a report on science and technology for development written at the request of the United Nations and published in 1970.

== History ==
In the late 1960s the United Nations asked for recommendations on science and technology for development from a team of academics at the Institute of Development Studies (IDS) and the Science Policy Research Unit (SPRU) at the University of Sussex, UK. This team became known as the Sussex Group and their report, Science and Technology to Developing Countries during the Second Development Decade, became known as the Sussex Manifesto.

The Sussex Manifesto was intended as the introductory chapter to the UN World Plan of Action on Science and Technology for Development. But the solutions presented in the Manifesto were deemed too radical to be used for that purpose. It was instead published in 1970 as an annex in Science and Technology for Development: Proposals for the Second United Nations Development Decade, a UN report by the Advisory Committee on the Application of Science and Technology to Development (ACAST).

The Sussex Manifesto helped raise awareness of science and technology for development in UN circles influenced the design of development institutions and was used for teaching courses in both North and South universities.

The Sussex Group were Hans Singer (Chairman), Charles Cooper (Secretary), R.C. Desai, Christopher Freeman, Oscar Gish, Stephen Hill and Geoffrey Oldham.

The Sussex Manifesto was originally published as the ‘Draft Introductory Statement for the World Plan of Action for the Application of Science and Technology to Development’, prepared by the ‘Sussex Group’, Annex II in 'Science and Technology for Development: Proposals for the Second Development Decade', United Nations, Dept of Economic and Social Affairs, New York, 1970, Document ST/ECA/133, and reprinted as 'The Sussex Manifesto: Science and Technology to Developing Countries during the Second Development Decade', IDS Reprints 101.

== Today ==
In 2008 one of the authors of the original report Professor Geoff Oldham gave a seminar at the STEPS Centre – a research centre and policy engagement based at IDS and SPRU. Following this event, the STEPS Centre decided to create a new manifesto in association with its partners around the world and Professor Oldham. The new publication, Innovation, Sustainability, Development: A New Manifesto, was launched in 2010, forty years after the original.

The New Manifesto has also been translated into Chinese, French, Portuguese and Spanish.

The STEPS Centre is funded by the Economic and Social Research Council (ESRC).
