= Daniele Archibugi =

Italian economic and political theorist

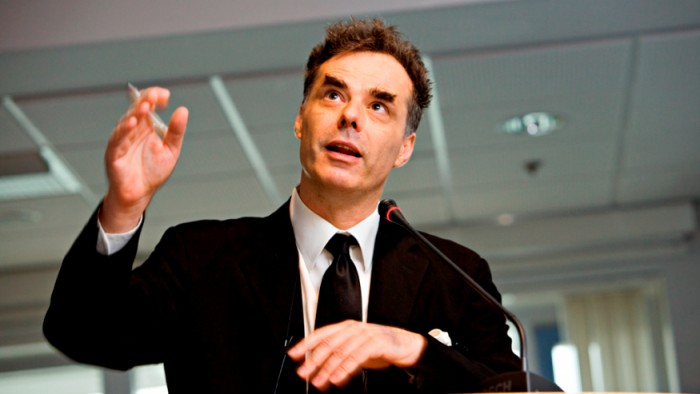
- Daniele Archibugi, Helsinki, 2006.
- Born: Daniele Archibugi; 17 July 1958 (age 68); Rome, Italy
- Education: Sapienza University of Rome; University of Sussex, Science Policy Research Unit
- Writing career
- Language: Italian

Daniele Archibugi (born 17 July 1958 in Rome, Italy) is an Italian economic and political theorist. He works on the economics and policy of innovation and technological change, on the political theory of international relations and on political and technological globalisation.

== Biography ==
Archibugi graduated with an Economics degree at the University of Rome "La Sapienza" with Federico Caffè, and obtained a D.Phil. degree at SPRU of the University of Sussex under the mentorship of Christopher Freeman and Keith Pavitt. He has worked and taught at the Universities of Sussex, Naples, Cambridge, Sapienza University of Rome, LUISS University of Rome, London School of Economics and Harvard University. He held courses at Asian Universities including the Ritsumeikan University, Kyoto and SWEFE University, Chengdu. He has also been visiting professor at the University of California, Santa Barbara, University of Buenos Aires and Autonomous University of Madrid. In June 2006, Archibugi was appointed Honorary Professor at the University of Sussex and in 2016 Honorary Member of the French Research Network of Innovation.

After several decades at the Italian National Research Council in Rome, he now works at the Universitas Mercatorum and at Birkbeck, University of London.

== Cosmopolitan democracy ==
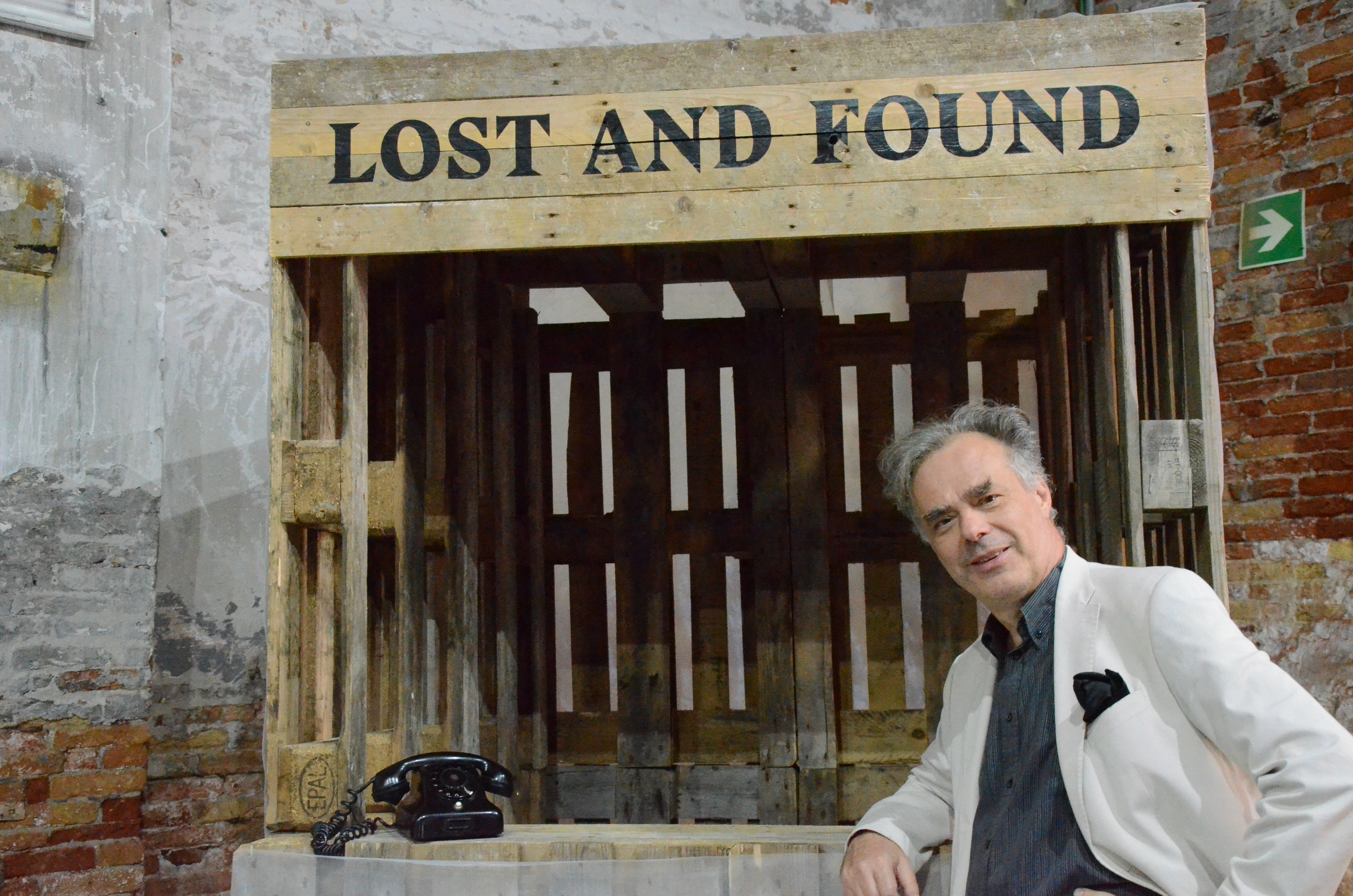
Daniele Archibugi, Venice Biennale, 2022.

Archibugi has been a key figure in the development of cosmopolitanism and of cosmopolitan democracy in particular, namely the attempt to apply some of the norms and values of democracy to global politics. He has advocated substantial reforms in international organizations, including the United Nations and the European Union.

He has criticized the G7, G8 and G20 summits as undemocratic and urged for more transparent gathering for global politics. He has also taken position against a League of Democracies arguing that the same demands will be better served by a democratic reform of the United Nations. Archibugi is among the promoters of a directly elected World Parliament, and a supporter of the Campaign for the Establishment of a United Nations Parliamentary Assembly, an organisation which campaigns for democratic reform in the United Nations.

== Global justice ==
Supporter of the individual responsibility of the rulers in the case of international crimes, Archibugi has also actively supported, since the fall of the Berlin Wall, the creation of an International Criminal Court, collaborating both with the jurists of the UN International Law Commission and with the Italian Government. Over the years, he has become increasingly skeptical for the inability of international courts to incriminate the strongest. He therefore endorsed other quasi-judicial instruments for human rights protection such as the Truth and Reconciliation Commissions and the Opinion Tribunals.

== Globalization of innovation ==
Archibugi developed a taxonomy of the globalization of technology with Jonathan Michie, where they distinguish among three main devices of transmission of know-how: international exploitation of innovations, global generation of innovation and global collaborations in science and technology.

As Chairman of an Expert Group of the European Research Area on international collaboration in science and technology, he has pointed out that the demographic decline in Europe, combined with the lack of vocation of youngsters for hard sciences, will generate a dramatic shortage of qualified workers in less than a generation. This will jeopardize the standard of livings of Europeans in key areas such as medical research, information technologies and knowledge intensive industries. Archibugi has urged for substantial revisions to European immigration policy in order to accommodate at least two million qualified students in science, engineering from developing countries in a decade.

== Reconstruction economics after economic crises ==
As a scholar of the business cycles, Archibugi combines the Keynesian perspective derived from his mentors Federico Caffè, Hyman Minsky and Nicholas Kaldor with the Schumpeterian perspective derived from Christopher Freeman and the Science Policy Research Unit of the University of Sussex. By combining the two perspectives, Archibugi argued that to get out of a crisis, a country must make a major effort to enter into emerging industries. In the absence of entrepreneurial spirit in the sector private, the public sector must develop the managerial capacity to exploit scientific and technological opportunities, also to safeguard public goods. This acquires more relevance in front of major events, including the environmental crisis and the economic crisis created by Covid-19.

== Family relations ==
He is the son of urban and economic planner Franco Archibugi and of writer Muzi Epifani. He has several brothers and sisters including film director Francesca Archibugi and political scientist Mathias Koenig-Archibugi.

His ancestors include Roman patriots Francesco and Alessandro Archibugi, both volunteers in the Roman University Battalion of the Roman Republic (1849) led by of Carlo Armellini, Giuseppe Mazzini and Aurelio Saffi. Both of them participated in the military actions led by General Giuseppe Garibaldi and died in the defence of the Roman Republic of June 1849 fighting against the invasion of Republican France led by Louis Napoleon. Archibugi has reminded this episode to show the fragility of the democratic peace theory.

== Main books ==
In the field of international relations and political studies

- (with David Held), Cosmopolitan Democracy. An Agenda for a New World Order, (Polity Press, 1995)
- (with David Held and Martin Koehler), Reimagining Political Community. Studies in Cosmopolitan Democracy, (Polity Press, 1998)
- Debating Cosmopolitics, (Verso Books, 2003)
- The Global Commonwealth of Citizens. Toward Cosmopolitan Democracy (Princeton University Press, 2008, ISBN 978-0-691-13490-1
- (with Guido Montani), European Democracy and Cosmopolitan Democracy (The Altiero Spinelli Institute for Federalist Studies, 2011) ISBN 978-88-89495-05-6
- (with Mathias Koenig-Archibugi and Raffaele Marchetti), Global Democracy: Normative and Empirical Perspectives (Cambridge University Press, 2011) ISBN 978-0-521-17498-5
- (with Ali Emre Benli), Claiming Citizenship Rights in Europe. Emerging Challenges and Political Agents (Routledge, 2018) ISBN 978-1-138-03673-4
- (with Alice Pease), Crime and Global Justice: The Dynamics of International Punishment, (Polity Press, 2018) ISBN 978-1509512621

In the field of science, technology and innovation policy

- (with Mario Pianta), The Technological Specialization of Advanced Countries, preface by Jacques Delors (Kluwer, 1992)
- (with Jonathan Michie), Technology, Globalisation and Economic Performance, preface by Richard R. Nelson (Cambridge University Press, 1997)
- (with Jonathan Michie), Trade, Growth and Technical Change, preface by Nathan Rosenberg (Cambridge University Press, 1998);
- (with Jonathan Michie), Innovation Policy in a Global Economy, preface by Christopher Freeman (Cambridge University Press, 1999);
- (with Bengt-Åke Lundvall), The Globalising Learning Economy (Oxford University Press, 2001). ISBN 978-0-199-258178
- (with Andrea Filippetti, Innovation and Economic Crises. Lessons and Prospects from the Economic Downturn (Routledge, 2011). ISBN 978-0-415-60228-0
- (with Andrea Filippetti, The Handbook of Global Science, Technology and Innovation (John Wiley & Sons, 2015). ISBN 978-1-118-73906-8

== Main refereed articles ==
In the field of international relations and political studies

- (with Marco Cellini and Azzurra Malgieri), The Reform of the UN Security Council: What Are the Issues?, ("Global Governance", 2025, vol. 31, no. 2, pp. 137–162), doi.org/10.1163/19426720-03102003
- (with Marco Cellini and Mattia Vitiello), Refugees in the European Union: From Emergency Alarmism to Common Management, ("Journal of Contemporary European Studies", 2021, pp. 1–19)
- Cosmopolitan Democracy as a Method for Addressing Controversies, ("Justice Magazine", no. 62, 2019)
- (with Marco Cellini), The Internal and External Levers to achieve Global Democracy, ("Journal of Global Policy", vol. 8, no. S6, 2017, Pages 65–77)
- (with David Held), Cosmopolitan Democracy: Paths and Agents, ("Ethics and International Affairs", vol. 25 no. 4, 2011, pp. 433–461)
- (with Marina Chiarugi), Piracy Challenges Global Governance, ("Opendemocracy", April 2009)
- A League of Democracies or a Democratic United Nations?, ("Harvard International Review", vol. 30, no. 2, 2008)
- Exporting Democracy. What Have We Learnt from Iraq?, ("Dissent", Spring 2007, pp. 40–42)
- The Language of Democracy: Vernacular or Esperanto? A Comparison between the Multiculturalist and Cosmopolitan Perspectives, ("Political Studies", vol. 53, no. 3, 2005, pp. 537–555)
- Notes on Democracy in the European Union, ("The European Union Review", vol. 10, no. 1, 2005, pp. 75–86)
- Cosmopolitan Democracy and its Critics: A Review, ("European Journal of International Relations", vol.10, no. 3, 2004, pp. 437–473)
- Cosmopolitan Guidelines for Humanitarian Intervention, ("Alternatives. Global, Local, Political", vol. 29, no. 1, 2004, pp. 1–21)
- A Critical Analysis of the Self-determination of Peoples. A Cosmopolitan Perspective, ("Constellations. An International Journal of Critical and Democratic Theory", vol. 10, no. 4, 2003, pp. 488–505)
- (with Iris Marion Young), Toward a Global Rule of Law, ("Dissent", vol. 48, Spring 2002, pp. 27–32)
- Demos and Cosmopolis, ("New Left Review", new series, no. 13, Jan – Feb 2002, pp. 24 – 38)
- Cosmopolitical Democracy , ("New Left Review", new series, no. 4, July Aug 2000, pp. 137 – 150)
- So What if Democracies Don't Fight Each Other?, ("Peace Review", vol. 9. no. 3, 1997, pp. 379–384)
- Immanuel Kant, Cosmopolitan Law and Peace, ("European Journal of International Relations", vol. 1, no. 4, pp. 429–456)
- The Reform of the UN and Cosmopolitan Democracy: A Critical Review, ("Journal of Peace Research", vol. 30, no. 3, 1993, pp. 301–315)
- Models of International Organization in Perpetual Peace Projects, ("Review of International Studies", vol. 18, no. 18, 1992, pp. 295–317)

In the field of science, technology and innovation policy

- (with Vitantonio Mariella and Antonio Vezzani, What next? Nations in the technological race through the 2030, ("Technological Forecasting and Social Change", Vol. 212 (March) 2025, 123987212)
- (with Viviana D’Angelo and Alberto Maria Radici, Assessing national technological advantage in circular economy innovations for the textile and leather sectors: A patent-based analysis, ("Technology Analysis & Strategic Management", January 2025 https://doi.org/10.1080/09537325.2025.2450627)
- (with Natalia Tosoni), Is users rating becoming overpowering? The risks of inappropriate use of digital feedback, Birkbeck College CIMR Research Working Paper Series, Working Paper No. 67, October 2023
- (with Rinaldo Evangelista and Antonio Vezzani), Regional technological capabilities and the access to H2020 funds, ("Journal of Common Market Studies", Vol. 60. No. 4. pp. 926–944, 2022)
- (with Vitantonio Mariella), Is a European recovery possible without high-tech public corporations?, ("Intereconomics", 2021, vol. 56, no. 3, pp. 160–166)
- Choosing your mentor: a letter to creative minds, "Journal of Innovation Economics & Management", 2021, pp. I99-13.
- (with Andrea Filippetti and Marion Frenz), Investment in innovation for European recovery: a public policy priority, ("Science and Public Policy", November 2019. DOI: 10.1093/scipol/scz049)
- (with Andrea Filippetti), The Retreat of Public Research and its Adverse Consequences on Innovation, (‘Technological Forecasting and Social Change’, 2018, vol. 127, February, Pages 97–111)
- Blade Runner Economics. Will Innovation Lead us Out of Crisis?, ("Research Policy". 2017, vol. 46, no. 3, April, Pages 535-543)
- (with Andrea Filippetti and Marion Frenz), The Impact of the Economic Crisis on Innovation: Evidence from Europe, ("Technological Forecasting and Social Change", vol. 80, 2013, pp. 1247–1260)
- (with Andrea Filippetti and Marion Frenz), Economic Crisis and Innovation: Is Destruction Prevailing over Accumulation? , ("Research Policy", vol. 42, no. 2, 2013 pp. 303–314)
- (with Andrea Filippetti), Is the Economic Crisis Impairing Convergence in Innovation Performance across Europe?, ("Journal of Common Market Studies", vol. 49, no. 6, 2011, pp. 1153–1182)
- (with Andrea Filippetti), The Globalization of Intellectual Property Rights. Four Learnt Lessons and Four Theses, ("Journal of Global Policy", vol. 1, no. 1, January 2010)
- (with Andrea Filippetti), Innovation in Times of Crisis: National System of Innovation, Structure and Demand, ("Research Policy", vol. 40, 2011, pp. 179–192)
- (with Mario Denni and Andrea Filippetti), The Technological Capabilities of Nations: The State of the Art of Synthetic Indicators("Technological Forecasting and Social Change", vol. 76, 2008, pp. 917–931)
- (with Fulvio Castellacci), The Technology Clubs: The Distribution of Knowledge across Nations("Research Policy", vol. 37, no. 10, 2008, pp. 1659–1673)
- (with Alberto Coco), Is Europe Becoming the Most Dynamic Knowledge Based Economy in the World?("Journal of Common Market Studies", vol. 43, no. 3, 2005, pp. 433–459)
- (with Alberto Coco), Measuring Technological Capabilities at the Country Level. A Comparison among Different Approaches("Research Policy", vol. 34, no. 2, 2005, pp. 175–194)
- (with Kim Bizzarri), Committing to Vaccine R&D: A Global Science Policy Priority("Research Policy", vol. 33, no. 10, 2004, pp. 175–194)
- (with Alberto Coco), A New Indicator of Technological Capabilities for Developed and Developing Countries("World Development", vol. 32, no. 4, April 2004, pp. 629–654)
- (with Carlo Pietrobelli), The Globalisation of Technology and its Implications for Developing Countries: Windows of Opportunity or Further Burden?("Technological Forecasting and Social Change", vol. 70, no. 9, November 2003, pp. 861–884)
- (with Simona Iammarino), The Globalisation of Technological Innovation: Definition and Evidence("Review of International Political Economy", vol. 9, no. 1, pp. 98–122, Spring 2002)
- Pavitt's Taxonomy Sixteen Years On: A Review Article("Economics of Innovation and New Technology ", September 2001, 415-125)
- (with Simona Iammarino), The Policy Implications of the Globalization of Innovation("Research Policy", vol. 28, no. 3, 1999, pp. 317–336)
- (with Roberto Simonetti), Objects and Subjects in Technological Interdependence. Towards a Framework to Monitor Innovation("International Journal of the Economics of Business", vol. 5, no. 3, November 1998, pp. 295–309)
- (with Rinaldo Evangelista, Giulio Perani and Fabio Rapiti), Nature and Impact of Innovation in Manufacturing Industry: Some Evidence from the Italian Innovation Survey("Research Policy", vol. 26, nos. 4–5, pp. 521–536)
- (with Mario Pianta), Measuring Technological Change Through Patents and Innovation Surveys("Technovation", vol. 16, no. 9, 1996, pp. 451–468)
- (with Jonathan Michie), The Globalisation of Technology: a New Taxonomy("Cambridge Journal of Economics", vol. 19. no. 1, 1995, pp. 121–140)
- (with Rinaldo Evangelista and Roberto Simonetti), Concentration, Firm Size, and Innovation. Evidence from Innovation Costs("Technovation", vol. 15, no. 3, 1995, pp. 153–164)
- (with Mario Pianta), Specialization and Size of Technological Activities in Industrial Countries: The Analysis of Patent Data("Research Policy", vol. 21, no. 1, 1992, pp. 79–93)
- Patenting as an indicator of technological innovation: a review("Science and Public Policy ", December 1992)
- (with Sergio Cesaratto and Giorgio Sirilli), Sources of Innovative Activities and Industrial Organization in Italy("Research Policy", vol. 20, no. 5, 1991, pp. 299–313)
- In Search of a Useful Measure of Technological Innovation(to Make Economists Happy without Discontenting Technologists)("Technological Forecasting and Social Change", vol. 34, no. 3, 1988, pp. 253–277)
