= Bob Sang =

British academic (1948–2009)

Bob Sang (27 March 1948 – 5 June 2009) was appointed by London South Bank University as the UK's first professor of patient and public involvement in 2006. He had also been a visiting fellow at CENTRIM.

He was educated at the University of East Anglia but failed his chemistry degree there. He later returned to studying and completed a public administration degree at the University of Sussex.

He was a pioneer of the idea of involving patients, service users and the public in health and social care, describing himself as a 'constructive subversive'.

Sang was a prolific networker and writer, contributing articles to journals including Health Policy Insight, British Journal of Healthcare Management, the Journal of Integrated Care and the Health Service Journal.

Following a career which combined academia, research and working in mental health, he established his own independent consultancy, Sang Jacobsson. His work through Sang Jacobsson included mentoring, training, policy work, facilitation and analysis, and was mainly for clients in the NHS and the UK health economy.

Sang was the co-founder with Jane Keep of the Engaging Communities Learning Network for the National Association of Primary and Care Trusts (NatPaCT), which was part of the now-closed NHS Modernisation Agency. The Engaging Communities Learning Network was designed to help NHS primary care trusts (PCTs) share good practice and learning about patient and public involvement and engagement.

He provided professional supervision to the ground-breaking Health Foundation Leadership Fellows Scheme which over five years directly involved patients and users in the leadership development of 64 NHS clinicians and managers.

He died of acute pancreatitis on 5 June 2009.
