= Pavitt =

Pavitt is a surname. Notable people with the surname include:

- Bill Pavitt (1920–1989), British footballer
- Bruce Pavitt (born 1959), American businessman
- James Pavitt (born 1946), American intelligence official
- Keith Pavitt (1937–2002), British academic
- Laurie Pavitt (1914–1989), British politician
- Ron Pavitt (1926–1988), British athlete
