= Local economic development =

Local economic development (LED) is an approach to economic development, of note in the developing world that, as its name implies, places importance on activities in and by cities, districts and regions. Local economic development combines economic development activities, urban planning, infrastructure development and social development activities to improve local conditions. LED encompasses a range of disciplines including physical planning, economics and marketing, all with the goal of building up the economic capacity of a local area to improve its economic future and the quality of life for all.

== Definitions for local economic development ==
There are several definitions for local economic development. In one of the early concept notes on LED, the World Bank in 2006 defined LED as "the process by which public, business and non-governmental sector partners work collectively to create better conditions for economic growth and employment generation. The aim is to improve the quality of life for all in the community".

In 2007 GTZ (now called GIZ) refined the definition of the World Bank by describing LED as "a process to mobilise stakeholders from the public and the private sectors as well as from civil society, to become partners in a joint effort to improve the economy of a defined subnational territory and thus increase its competitiveness".

The Swiss Agency for Development and Cooperation defined LED as "a broad set of activities, which aim at creating a competitive advantage for an urban or rural territory and for the enterprises in this territory to improve territorial attractiveness and economic wellbeing". This definition was developed for the SDC by Mesopartner, a research consultancy specialising in LED that was co-founded by the late Jörg Meyer-Stamer.

Different developmental organisations tend to emphasise elements in the definitions that are aligned with their specific mandate. For instance, UN-Habitat defines LED "a participatory process where local people from all sectors work together to stimulate local commercial activity resulting in a resilient and sustainable economy." and as "an approach to help create decent jobs and improve the quality of life for everyone, including the poor and marginalized".

The International Labour Organization (ILO) defines LED as "a participatory development process that encourages partnership arrangements between the main private and public stakeholders of a defined territory, enabling the joint design and implementation of a common development strategy, by making use of the local resources and competitive advantage in a global context, with the final objective of creating decent jobs and stimulating economic activity".

From these different definitions of LED there are several core elements that are common:

- It takes place within a defined territory
- It has a strong bottom-up orientation, it is driven by local stakeholders
- It involves a range of stakeholders from the public and private sector, as well as from civil society
- It is about improving the competitiveness and attractiveness of the location
- It is undertaken for the purpose of fostering economic well-being

With the rapid changes in global, national and local economies, increasingly definitions of LED are adding aspects of inclusiveness, sustainability and resilience. Many international development organisations see LED as complementary to other support measures, such as improving governance, reducing inward migration and improving urban development. International development projects or national government projects can help to establish or enhance LED locally, but should not replace or displace local effort. As a consequence, the aim of an externally support should be to establish an effective LED process locally, not to solve the problems of the locality with regards to its economy.

There are more definitions out there. Many countries, development organisations and even locations have created their own definitions.

== Approach ==
There are two broad approaches to LED. One is about developing a strategy for a location, mainly through planning. This is often the preferred approach by international development organisations and governments in developing countries. The other approach is a more iterative approach where local stakeholders jointly learn about what is possible in the local context. In this approach a broad range of private and public stakeholders cooperate to improve local conditions to create jobs and local wealth.

According to the ILO, national and local governments, as well as enterprises and other organisations have to rethink development strategies to cope with ongoing events such as globalization. In contrast to traditional development policies, local economic development strategies promote local dialogue and enable people to be more proactive; help to make local institutions better contribute to development; make economic activity dependent on the comparative advantages of a specific territory, generating development by firms more capable to withstand changes in the global economic environment rather than top-down development imposed by national planners. Economic development activities in developing countries tend to be unidisciplinary, initiated and implemented by just one ministry or agency. An advantage of LED approaches is that they facilitate a multidisciplinary approach. South Africa has been particularly active in promoting the concept.

=== Local economic development responses to the COVID-19 pandemic ===
With the COVID-19 pandemic and associated restrictions impacting the economies of many cities and towns, local economic development responses played a particularly important role. Key approaches included support to keep businesses afloat during lockdowns and other restrictions, efforts to reactivate cities after restrictions eased, and a focus on long-term economic development. Lessons that emerged from the experience of the pandemic include the need to respond and iterate rapidly, the importance of collaboration between stakeholders and different tiers of government, and the need to maintain a focus on multiple time horizons, even in the midst of the crisis.

=== LED in South Africa: pro-poor vs. pro-growth ===
Many LED interventions in South Africa have taken a direct pro-poor intervention, leading to questions regarding whether this approach is more effective in terms of poverty relief than the spin-offs of more pro-growth focused endeavours. The Microeconomic Reform Strategy is a central component of the 2005 policy guidelines for implementing LED in South Africa. This strategy seeks to address the inequalities in the country and to build on the RDP (Reconstruction and Development Program), by focusing on issues of the geographical spread of activity, integration, black economic empowerment, knowledge-led growth, skills development and state responsiveness.

In addition to the laws and policies directly supporting and encouraging pro-poor LED, other instruments, such as integrated development planning, provide additional support for implementation. Integrated development planning is a key process used within LED, which looks toward the use of planning to situate pro-poor development and LED specifically. The South African Forum for Effective Planning and Development in 1995 defined integrated development planning as, ‘A participatory approach to integrate economic, sectoral, spatial, social, institutional, environmental and fiscal strategies in order to support the optimal allocation of scarce resources between sectors and geographical areas and across the population in a manner that provides sustainable growth, equity and the empowerment of the poor and the marginalised’.

==== Integrated development planning ====
In terms of what an 'integrated development plan' (IDP) should include, the Municipal Systems Act clearly brings out the pro-poor dimensions of government thinking. The act states that an integrated development plan must reflect:

- The municipal council's vision for the long-term development of the municipality. Special emphasis is to be placed on the municipality's most critical development needs
- An assessment of the existing level of development in the municipality. This should include the identification of any communities which do not have access to adequate basic services
- The council's long-term development vision and should consider the need for social and economic advancement of disadvantaged sections of the community
- The IDP must describe in detail how the municipal council will realise its development objectives and the time frame within which those objectives will be realised
- The council's spatial development framework, which should guide the way in which the physical area will be developed

It is suggested that IDP can assist in the promotion of socio-economic development in at least three ways; first, in helping to attract funds from other spheres of government, donor organisations and investors through defining and packaging attractive projects and programmes; secondly in helping to create an environment that is conducive to private sector investment and the general promotion of LED; and thirdly, by proposing direct interventions in the economy through, for example, providing incentives, developing economic infrastructure, and buying, developing and leasing/selling land.

==== Public participation ====
A participatory approach to LED involves the inclusion of different stakeholders so that their views, concerns and issues can be included in the planning process. This is important because it is here that networks, partnerships and information sharing occur that make better, more practical, strategies possible.

Variables to be considered when conducting this inventory should reflect the components of a functioning economy, such as human and social capital, financial capital, physical capital and natural capital.

In South Africa, municipalities are specifically required to involve communities in the affairs of the municipality, to provide services in a financially sustainable manner and to promote development. For instance, public participation is a key element of the Systems Act, and municipalities are obliged to establish mechanisms for public participation and participatory governance.

==== Conclusions ====
There is entrenched policy support for pro-poor development in South Africa – often being the primary focus of municipal vision/mission statements. In many cases it is treated as the partner of pro-growth/economic growth interventions. This situation is to be welcomed and reflects both local imperatives and responsiveness and local adherence to nationally identified objectives.

Given the dual challenges faced by South African society of needing to address both chronic poverty, yet also to achieve economic growth and global competitiveness, from a policy perspective it would seem that the approach adopted by Mangaung, Cape Town and eThekwini is most appropriate. These municipalities took a middle of the road approach, focusing their LED strategy on addressing both issues of poverty and growth and the fundamental linkages between the two (World Bank, 2005, 75). The following case studies present pro-growth endeavours that have led to tangible pro-poor driven growth: Johannesburg's Fashion District; eThekwini'sregeneration projects; and Ingwe's rail-based tourism initiatives.

These case studies show that pro-poor, community-based initiatives that are market linked, providing a viable product and operating in an economically effective fashion, can help disadvantaged community members to effectively participate in the market economy. Similarly, community-based service provision and labour-intensive employment is an effective mechanisms to extend services and create employment and business opportunities for the poor (World Bank, 2005, 78).

==== Land-use planning for LED ====
Land-use planning and development control serve as measurable tools for LED. The assignment of property rights in land and third party enforcement are essential for the efficient operation of markets. Public intervention ensures the separation of incompatible land-uses, integrated planning and development of synergistic land uses, and the 'public goods' aspect of necessary public facilities, open space and infrastructure investment (Lai, 1994, 78-80). Land use planning and development control are essential for the existence and operation of land and property markets (Alexander, 48). For instance, the assignment of and control over land uses will generally reduce transaction costs and can create or enlarge markets (Lai, 1994, 91).

The following are a list of public land use and development controls that the Ontario Ministry of Municipal Affairs and Housing lists as useful methods in promoting economic development.

Zoning by-laws

Zoning by-laws are used to specify matters such as density, uses of land, parking requirements and form-related standards – including building heights, lot coverage, setbacks, minimum lot sizes, and other building envelope specifications. To keep pace with market conditions and to create higher-quality built environments, flexible and context-relevant standards can be implemented to support economic development goals.

Height and density exchange

Municipalities can require that facilities, services and matters, as set out in an official plan and by-law, be provided in return for an increase in building height and/or density. This exchange might include streetscape and design elements – for example, protected bicycle parking, outdoor seating, non-slip pedestrian surfaces or public art – in support of municipal placemaking and economic development objectives.

Minimum and maximum standards

More efficient built forms can be achieved through by-law standards for minimum and maximum building height and density. Community resources such as nearby services, public transit, utilities, and existing road and sidewalk networks and greenspaces, can be used more effectively while expanding the number of potential customers for area businesses.
