= Philipp Sandner =

German economist and academic (1980–2024)

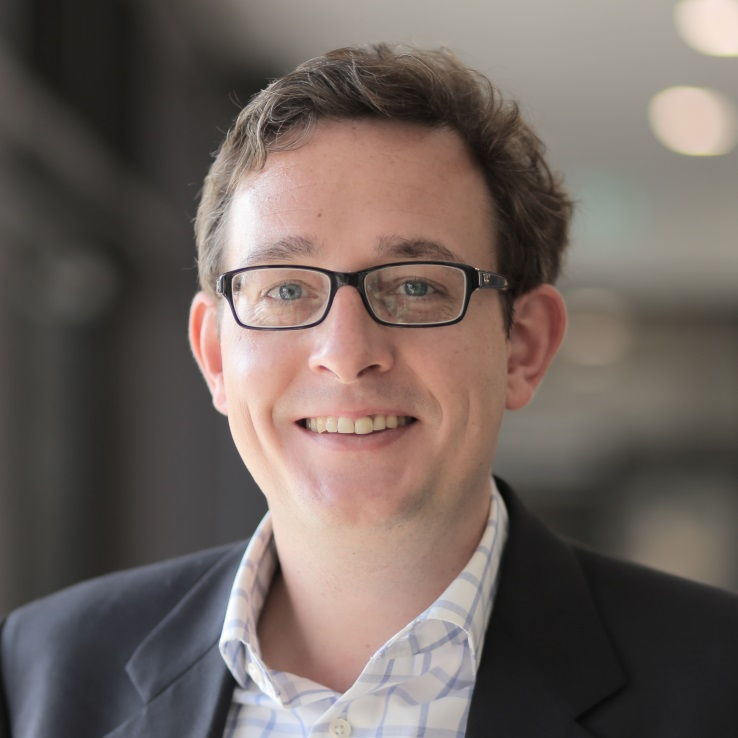
- Born: 23 February 1980; Heidelberg, Baden-Württemberg, West Germany
- Died: 16 January 2024 (aged 43)
- Title: Prof. Dr. oec. publ.

Academic background
- Education: University of Mannheim, Copenhagen Business School, LMU Munich
- Thesis: The Valuation of Intangible Assets (2009)
- Doctoral advisor: Dietmar Harhoff

Academic work
- Discipline: Blockchain Technology

Philipp Sandner (23 February 1980 – 16 January 2024) was a German economist and professor at the Frankfurt School of Finance & Management, where he founded and led the Frankfurt School Blockchain Center (FSBC).

== Life and career ==
Sandner was born in 1980 in Heidelberg. Following his Abitur, he completed civilian service in 1999 and studied business administration with a specialisation in business informatics (Wirtschaftsinformatik) at the University of Mannheim and at the Copenhagen Business School from 2000 to 2005. From 2005 to 2009, he worked as a researcher at the Institute for Innovation Research, Technology Management and Entrepreneurship at LMU Munich under Dietmar Harhoff. He obtained his doctorate (Dr. oec. publ.) in 2009 with his dissertation on The Valuation of Intangible Assets at LMU Munich. He also completed his Master of Business Research (MBR) at this institution. He attended the Berkeley Center for Law & Technology at the University of California, Berkeley for a research placement in 2008. From 2010 to 2012, he worked as a postdoctoral researcher at the Chair for Strategy and Organisation under Isabell Welpe at the Technical University of Munich.

From 2010 to 2015, Sandner was co-founder and partner of the Munich Innovation Group, a consulting firm specialising in innovation strategy and technology transfer. He became professor at the Frankfurt School of Finance & Management in 2015. In February 2017, the Blockchain Center was founded at the Frankfurt School, with Sandner as its director. The Frankfurt School Blockchain Center analysed the implications of blockchain technology for companies and the economy and served as a platform for knowledge exchange among decision-makers, start-ups, and technology and industry experts.

Due to his expertise, Sandner was appointed to the FinTech Council of the Federal Ministry of Finance (Germany) in 2017, as well as to the working group of the EU Blockchain Observatory of the European Union. Furthermore, the working group "National Risk Analysis", established by the Federal Ministry of Finance, consulted Sandner on matters concerning crypto assets such as Bitcoin. In 2022, he joined the Digital Finance Forum (DFF) initiated by the Federal Ministry of Finance (Germany).

The German business magazine Capital listed Sandner in the category "Top 40 under 40". According to the Frankfurter Allgemeine Zeitung, he was also among Germany's most influential economists in 2018, 2019, 2020, and 2021.

Sandner died on 16 January 2024, at the age of 43. He was survived by his wife and two daughters. His successor as Director of the Frankfurt School Blockchain Center was Co-Pierre Georg, who assumed the role in September 2024.

== Positions ==
Sandner regarded the development of blockchain technologies as a long-term disruptive innovation that would significantly transform the financial sector. In an interview with ARD, he stated that security token offerings would "significantly change the business model of Deutsche Börse in a few years". Speaking on Tagesschau, he argued that investors increasingly turn to real assets during rising inflation, including gold, real estate, and Bitcoin.

In 2018, Sandner noted that blockchain technologies were still at the beginning of their development and that existing blockchain solutions remained in an experimental environment. He generally argued that critics of Bitcoin or blockchain technology lacked sufficient technical understanding, stating that a person with demonstrably good understanding of the technology who was simultaneously sceptical of Bitcoin was difficult to find.

== Research and teaching ==
Sandner conducted research particularly in the areas of blockchain technology, Bitcoin, crypto assets, Decentralized Finance (DeFi), distributed ledger technology (DLT), digital programmable euro, stablecoins, and digital securities. He also worked on corporate entrepreneurship, digital transformation (including by fintech start-ups), strategic innovation, financing of start-ups (through strategic investors, business angels and venture capital) and intellectual property rights.

Sandner received several scholarships and best paper awards. His research was published in international journals such as the Journal of Marketing, Administrative Science Quarterly, Research Policy, the Journal of Marketing Research and the Journal of Business Venturing. His teaching covered digitalisation, entrepreneurship, innovation management and intellectual property rights.

== Selected publications ==
- A. Ter Wal, O. Alexy, J. Block, P. Sandner: "The best of both worlds: the benefits of open-specialized and closed-diverse syndication networks for new ventures' success". In: Administrative Science Quarterly. Vol. 61, No. 3, 2016, pp. 393–432.
- P. Böing, E. Müller, P. Sandner: "China's R&D Explosion: analyzing productivity effects across ownership types and over time". In: Research Policy. Vol. 45, No. 1, 2016, pp. 159–176.
- A. Tumasjan, T. Sprenger, P. Sandner, I. Welpe: "Election forecasts with Twitter: how 140 characters reflect the political landscape". In: Social Science Computer Review. Vol. 29, No. 4, 2011, pp. 402–418.
- P. Sandner, I. Welpe, A. Tumasjan: Die Zukunft ist dezentral: wie die Blockchain Unternehmen und den Finanzsektor auf den Kopf stellen wird. 2020.
- P. Sandner, I. Welpe, A. Tumasjan: Der Blockchain-Faktor: wie die Blockchain unsere Gesellschaft verändern wird. 2019.
- P. Sandner: The Valuation of Intangible Assets: an Exploration of Patent and Trademark Portfolios. Dissertation, LMU Munich, 2009.
