= Jan Fagerberg =

Jan Fagerberg is professor at the University of Oslo, Norway.

He is, or has been, affiliated with many institutions including: the Centre for Technology, Innovation and Culture (TIK) (Oslo), the Centre for Innovation, Research and Competence in the Learning Economy (CIRCLE) (Lund University, Sweden); the Norwegian Ministry of Finance, the Norwegian Institute for Foreign Affairs (NUPI) and Aalborg University, Denmark. He has also been visiting professor at University of California San Diego, the University of Maastricht, the University of Paris XIII, Copenhagen Business School and was a “Gulbenkian Professor” at the Technical University of Lisbon.

His work examines the relationship between innovation, the diffusion of technology, competitiveness and growth and he has published widely on these themes.

His background is in history, political science and economics and he holds degrees from University of Bergen (1980 economics), PhD University of Sussex (1989) where he was based at the Science and Technology Policy Research.

== Selected publications ==
- Fagerberg, J., Paolo Guerrieri and Bart Verspagen (1999) The Economic Challenge for Europe: Adapting to Innovation Based Growth, Edward Elgar
- Fagerberg, J., (2002) Technology, Growth and Competitiveness: Selected Essays, Edward Elgar
- Fagerberg, J., David Mowery and Richard Nelson (2004) The Oxford Handbook of Innovation, Oxford University Press
- Fagerberg, J., David Mowery and Bart Verspagen (2009) Innovation, Path Dependency and Policy: The Norwegian case, Oxford University Press
