= Raffaele Marchetti =

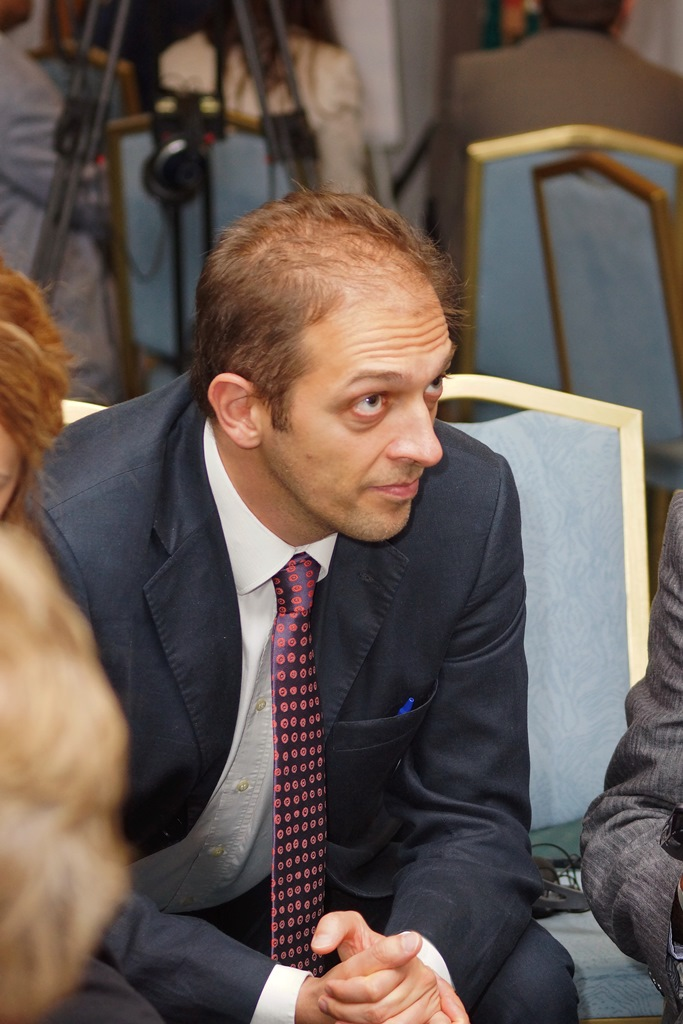

Raffaele Marchetti (13 December 1975) is an Italian political scientist and editorialist.

== Biography ==
He is full professor at LUISS Guido Carli of Rome, where he teaches International Relations in the Department of Political Sciences and in the School of Government. In LUISS he held a Jean Monnet Module on European Union’s Engagement with Civil Society (2012-2015) and coordinates the preparatory course for the diplomatic concours and a course on strategic affairs. He acts also as external evaluator for a number of public institutions and private companies at the national and international level on issues of civil society, peacebuilding, transnational networks, and governance

His research interests are about global politics, global governance, transnational civil society, democracy, political risk, and city diplomacy.

He has produced one of the first MOOCs on IR: "From International Relations to Global Politics" for Iversity.

He is currently completing a monography on Dynamics Global Politics: Goals, Strategies, and Impact of Non-State Actors and is working on a longer term project entitled Constructing Global Legitimacy. The Competition for World Order.

After having read Philosophy at the Sapienza University of Rome, he took a PhD in Government at the London School of Economics and Political Science, completing a thesis entitled "Cosmopolitanism restated. A choice-based consequentialist perspective on global democratic inclusion: The cases of migration and world federalism". Later he had two post-docs as Jean Monnet Fellow at the European University Institute and as assegnista at LUISS Guido Carli.

He was scientific coordinator of the project SHUR. Human Rights in Conflicts: The Role of Civil Society funded by the European Commission within the 6thFP. He was visiting professor at China Foreign Affairs University-Beijing, Sciences Po-Paris, Strathmore University-Nairobi, Université de Geneve, and Waseda-Tokyo. He was fellow at the Italian National Research Council, research fellow within the Network of Excellence GARNET. Global Governance, Regionalisation & Regulation: The Role of the EU and in the project DEMOS. Democracy in Europe and the Mobilization of Society both funded by the European Commission, and contractor for the European Union Institute for Security Studies-EUISS of Paris and the Istituto San Pio V of Rome.

He taught at the London School of Economics, American University of Rome, John Cabot University, MGIMO, Universitè de Genève and University of Naples Orientale.

He carried out research at the University of Exeter, University of Nottingham, and University di Urbino.

In 2005 he won the Lawrence S. Finkelstein Award from the International Studies Association-ISA, Section on International Organization.

In 2010 he was rapporteur for the European Commission (DG Research) on Civil Society and Global Governance. He is involved in the LUISS PhD programmes: the PhD in Political Theory and Political Science, and the Joint Doctorate Programme Globalization, Europe, and Multilateralism-GEM.

== Major works ==
Monographs

- 2017. Cybersecurity. Hacker, spie, terroristi e le nuove minacce del web, Luiss UP, with R.Mulas
- 2016. Global Strategic Engagement. States and Non-State Actors in Global Governance, Lexington Books
- 2013. La politica della globalizzazione, Milan: Mondadori
- 2010. Manuale di politica internazionale, Milan: Egea-Università Bocconi Editore-UBE (co-authors: F.Mazzei and F.Petito)
- 2010. Democrazia globale: Principi, istituzioni e lotte per la nuova inclusione politica, Milan: Vita & Pensiero
- 2008. Global Democracy: For and Against. Ethical Theory, Institutional Design, and Social Struggles, London-New York: Routledge (2009, pb edition).

Edited Books

- 2017. Still a Western World? Continuity and Change in World Order, London: Routledge (co-edited with S.Fabbrini)
- 2017. Partnership in International Policy Making: Civil Society and Public Institutions in Global and European Affairs, London: Palgrave
- 2013. Contemporary Political Agency: Theory and Practice, London: Routledge (co-editor: B.Maiguashca)
- 2011. Global Democracy: Normative and Empirical Perspectives, Cambridge: Cambridge University Press (co-editors: D.Archibugi and M.Koenig-Archibugi)
- 2011. Conflict Society and Peacebuilding, Delhi: Routledge (co-editor: N.Tocci)
- 2011. Civil Society, Conflicts, and the Politicization of Human Rights, Tokyo: United Nations University Press (co-editor: N.Tocci)
- 2010. European Union and Global Democracy, Zagreb: CPI (co-editor D. Vidović)

Key articles and book chapters

- 2017. Pendulum. EU’s Geopolitical Choices and the West-East Relationship, in Schulze P. (ed.) Core Europe and Greater Eurasia. A Roadmap for the Future, Frankfurt a/M: Campus Verlag, 35-52.
- 2016. Advocacy Strategies for Human Rights: The Campaign for the Moratorium on Death Penalty, Italian Political Science Review, 46, 3: 355-78
- 2016. 全球治理中的跨国行动主义 (Challenges and Opportunities for Transnational Activism in Global Governance), in J. Lu (ed.) 全球治理：困境和改革 Global Governance: Predicament and Reform, Beijing: Social Sciences Academic Press of China, 284-99.
- 2015. The Conditions for Civil Society Participation in International Decision Making, in D. della Porta and M. Diani The Oxford Handbook of Social Movements, Oxford: Oxford University Press: 753-766.
- 2015. Trapped in the Liberal Peace. The European Union Approach to Peacebuilding via Civil Society, in J.Boulden and W.Kymlicka (eds.) International Approaches to Governing Ethnic Diversity, Oxford: Oxford University Press, 169-97 (with N.Tocci).
- 2014. 全球治理中的市民社会 (Civil Society in Global Governance), in 朱立群、富里奥·塞鲁蒂、卢静主编 (eds.), 球治理：挑战与趋势 (Global Governance: Challenges and Trends), Beijing: Social Sciences Academic Press, 32-51.
- 2013. Civil Society-Government Synergy and Normative Power Italy, The International Spectator: Italian Journal of International Affairs, 48, 4: 102-118
- 2013. Global Migratory Policies: Neither Closed nor Open Borders, in J. Satvinder (ed.) The Ashgate Research Companion to Migration Law, Theory & Policy, Ashgate: London, 581-97.
- 2013. Social Movements, Public Opinion, and Global Governance, in M.Telò (ed.) Globalization, Europe, Multilateralism, Ashgate: Aldershot, 301-15.
- 2012. Global Social Movement Networks of Civil Society and the Politics of Change, in P.Utting, M.Pianta, and A.Ellersiek (eds.) Justice Activism and Policy Reform in Europe: Understanding When Change Happens, London: Routledge, 93-111 (with M. Pianta).
- 2011. Transnational Activism and the Global Justice Movement, in G.Delanty and S.Turner (eds.) Handbook of Contemporary Social and Political Theory, London: Routledge, 428-38 (with D. della Porta).
- 2011. The Role of Civil Society in Global Governance, in A.Vasconcelos (ed.) Global Governance. Building on the Civil Society Agenda, Paris: The European Union Institute for Security Studies-EUISS, 15-30.
- 2011. Redefining EU Engagement with Conflict Society, in R.Marchetti and N.Tocci (eds.) Civil Society, Ethnic Conflicts, and the Politicization of Human Rights, Tokyo: United Nations University Press, 181-203 (with N. Tocci).
- 2011. Conflict Society and Human Rights: An Analytical Framework, in R.Marchetti and N.Tocci (eds.) Civil Society, Ethnic Conflicts, and the Politicization of Human Rights, Tokyo: United Nations University Press, 47-72 (with N. Tocci).
- 2011. Models of Global Democracy: In Defence of Cosmo-Federalism, in D.Archibugi, M.Koenig-Archibugi, and R. Marchetti (eds.) Global Democracy: Normative and Empirical Perspectives, Cambridge: Cambridge University Press, 22-46.
- 2010. I principi della politica estera dell’Unione Europea: una rassegna normativa, in E.Pföstl (ed.) Rapporti tra Unione Europea e organizzazioni internazionali, Rome: Ed. Apes, 17-46.
- 2010. Global Democracy, in R.A.Danemark (ed.) The International Studies Compendium Project-Section on International Ethics, Oxford: Blackwell, Vol. V: 3007-3023.
- 2010. Fighting Transnational Exclusion: From Cosmopolitanism to Global Democracy, New Political Science, 3, 1: 103-110.
- 2009. Mapping Alternative Models of Global Politics, in International Studies Review, 11, 1: 133-56.
- 2009. Global Citizenship: The Case of Migrants and Residents, Refugee Watch. A South Asian Journal on Forced Migration, 34: 56-68.
- 2009. Democratic Ethics and United Nations Reform, in A.Franceschet (ed.) The Ethics of Global Governance, Boulder: Lynne Rienner, 51-66 (with D. Archibugi).
- 2009. Crossing Borders. Transnational Activism in European Social Movements, in D.della Porta (ed.) Democracy in Movement. Conceptions and practices of democracy in contemporary social movements, London: Palgrave, 234-61 (with M.Pianta and D.Zola)
- 2009. Conflict Society: Understanding the Role of Civil Society in Conflict, Global Change, Peace and Security, 21: 2: 201-17 (with N.Tocci).
- 2009. Civilizationism and the Political Debate on Globalization, in M.S.Michális & F.Petito (eds) Civilizational Dialogue and World Order. The Other Politics of Cultures, Religions and Civilizations in International Relations, London: Palgrave, 93-110.
- 2008. Toward a World Migratory Regime, Indiana Journal of Global Legal Studies, 15, 2: 471-487.
- 2008. A Matter of Drawing Boundaries: Global Democracy and International Exclusion, Review of International Studies, 34, 2: 207-224.
- 2007. The Global Justice Movements: The Transnational Dimension, in D.della Porta (ed.), The Global Justice Movement: A Cross-national and Transnational Perspective, Boulder, CO: Paradigm, 29-51 (with M.Pianta).
- 2006. Global Governance or World Federalism? A Cosmopolitan Dispute on Institutional Models, Global Society. Journal of Interdisciplinary International Relations, 20, 3: 287-305.
- 2005. Justice and the Problem of International Exclusion, Constellations, An International Journal of Critical and Democratic Theory, 12: 4: 487-501.
