= Christopher Freeman =

British economist

- Born: 11 September 1921; Sheffield, England
- Died: 16 August 2010 (aged 88); Lewes, England
- Spouses: Peggotty Selson (died 1971) Margaret Young (divorced) Carlota Perez (after 2007)

Academic background
- Influences: Karl Marx; Joseph Schumpeter; John Desmond Bernal

Academic work
- Discipline: Science Policy and Innovation
- School or tradition: Schumpeterian
- Institutions: Science Policy Research Unit
- Awards: Bernal Prize (1987), Schumpeter Prize (1988), Prix International du Futuroscope (1993), World Technology Network Award for Policy (2001), Silver Kondratieff Medal (2007)

Christopher Freeman (11 September 1921 – 16 August 2010) was a British economist, recognised as one of the founders of the post-war school of Innovation Studies. He played a lead role in the development of the neo-Schumpeterian tradition focusing on the crucial role of innovation for economic development and of scientific and technological activities for well-being.

== Innovation studies ==
Freeman was the founder and first Director, from 1966 to 1982, of SPRU, the Science Policy Research Unit of the University of Sussex, England, and RM Phillips Professor of Science Policy and later professor emeritus of at the University of Sussex. In 1986, on his formal retirement, he became visiting professor at the Aalborg University in Denmark and professorial fellow at the now Maastricht University in the Netherlands.

With various colleagues, Freeman made pioneering contributions to Innovation Studies in a number of respects. As consultant for the OECD, he was responsible for the development of 'The Frascati Manual', the first program designed to collect and standardize the statistics on R&D which resulted in the development of now commonly used science and technology indicators at OECD. He helped to shape a tradition of research into firm-based innovation during the early 1970s and was a prominent participant in the discussion around the influential Club of Rome's Limits to Growth Report, arguing presciently that the response to environmental degradation required a reformulation of the character of economic growth rather than the elimination of economic growth. With colleagues he played a lead role in recognising the historic significance of the development of microelectronic based technologies. This matured into the development of what has come to be called the Techno-Economic Paradigm theory of long waves, building on Kondratieff long wave theory. In collaboration with Carlota Perez (whom he subsequently married), Luc Soete and Francisco Louçã he made path-breaking contributions to this field.

In the early 1990s, together with B.-Å. Lundvall, Freeman developed the concept of National System of Innovation which is widely used to understand the multiple drivers of innovation paths in different countries, regions and sectors. Throughout his career and influenced by John Desmond Bernal, his mentor at the London School of Economics where he studied after demobilisation after World War II, Freeman fused an analysis of the determinants of innovation in contemporary capitalism with an abiding interest in the social shaping and impact of economic growth. As a natural consequence of this, Freeman had a deep commitment to the understanding and promotion of an equitable path of economic growth in the developing world (as seen in the Sussex Manifesto).

As a consequence of these significant and wide-ranging contributions, Freeman interacted with and mentored a number of economists and social scientists such as Geoffrey Oldham, Keith Pavitt, Luc Soete, Carlota Perez, B.-Å. Lundvall, Francisco Louçã, Martin Bell, Daniele Archibugi, Giovanni Dosi, Julian Perry Robinson and Jan Fagerberg. His intellectual legacy has extended to almost every continent through SPRU graduates, some of whom have applied his thinking to the role of innovation in development in Africa, Asia, Latin America and the Caribbean. Programs that have their origins in his work can be traced at leading public policy institutions such as the Belfer Center for Science and International Affairs at Harvard Kennedy School, where one of his influential African students Calestous Juma played a leading role.

== Awards and honours ==
Freeman held several honorary doctorates including those from the Universities of Linköping, Sussex, Middlesex, Birmingham, Brighton. He received the 1987 Bernal Prize, the 1988 Schumpeter Prize, and the 1993 Prix International du Futuroscope. In 2007 he was awarded with the Silver Kondratieff Medal by the International N. D. Kondratieff Foundation and the Russian Academy of Natural Sciences (RAEN).

The Freeman Centre building in Brighton, former home to CENTRIM and SPRU, is named after him.

== Selected publications ==
- Developing science, technology and innovation indicators: What we can learn from the past, Research Policy, 2009, vol. 38, issue 4, pages 583–589 (with Luc L. Soete), doi:10.1016/j.respol.2009.01.018
- Systems of Innovation: Selected Essays in Evolutionary Economics, Edward Elgar Publishing Ltd, 2008.
- As Time Goes By: From the Industrial Revolutions to the Information Revolution (co-author with Francisco Louçã), Oxford, Oxford University Press, 2002.
- The Economics of Industrial Innovation, 3rd edn. (co-author with Luc Soete), Pinter, London, 1997.
- Work for All or Mass Unemployment?: Computerised Technical Change in the Twenty-First Century, (co-author with Luc Soete), Pinter Pub Ltd, 1994.
- The Economics of Hope: Essays on Technical Change, Economic Growth, and the Environment, Pinter Pub Ltd, 1992.
- Technology Policy and Economic Performance: Lessons from Japan, Pinter Pub Ltd, 1987.
- Unemployment and Technical Innovation: A Study of Long Waves and Economic Development, (co-author with John Clark and Luc Soete), Greenwood Press, 1982.

== Works on Freeman ==
- Technology and the Human Prospect: Essays in Honour of Christopher Freeman edited by Roy MacLeod. London: Pinter Pub Ltd (1986)
- Mammo Muchie; Christopher Freeman: the founder and doyen of the economics of innovation theory Innovation and Development, Volume 1, Issue 1, 2011, pages 135–150.
- Jan Fagerberg, Morten Fosaas, Martin Bell and Ben R. Martin; Christopher Freeman: social science entrepreneur Research Policy, Volume 40, Issue 7, September 2011, Pages 897–916.
