= Helmut Krauch =

German scientist and professor

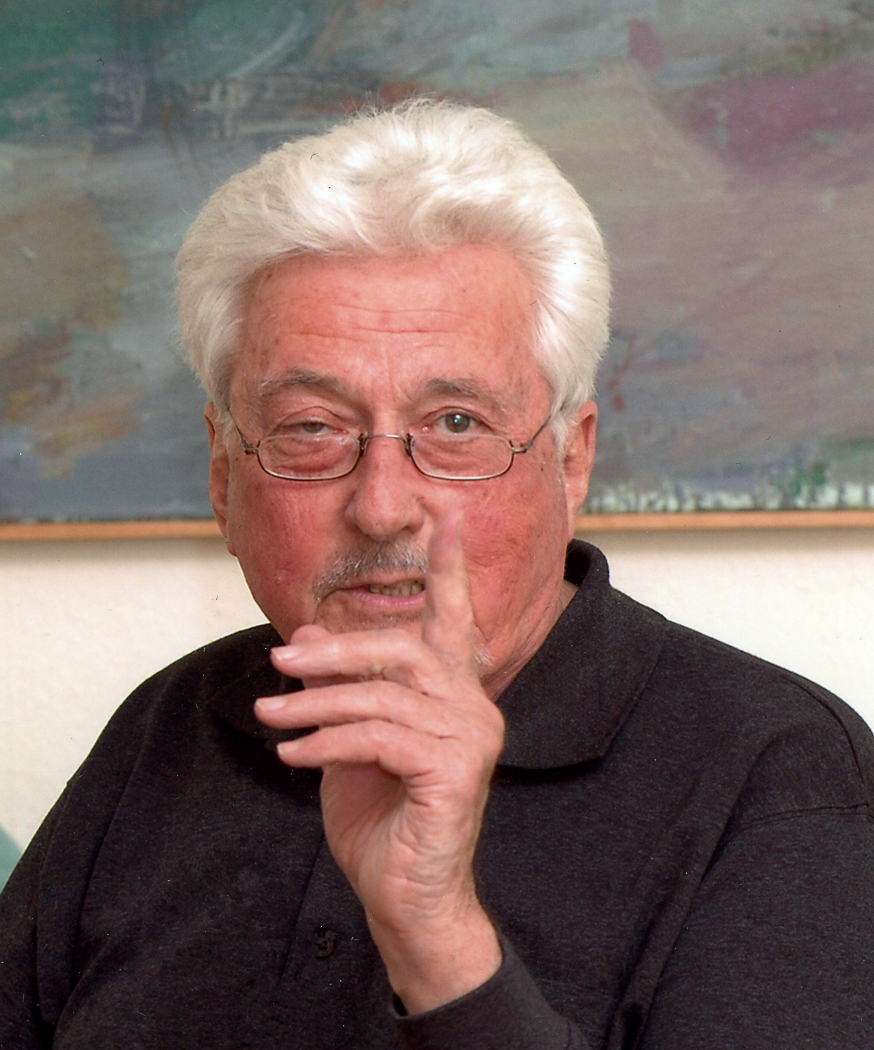

Helmut Krauch (2 May 1927 – October 14, 2010) was a German scientist who was known for his publications in systems theory and design theory and his works in conceptual art. He was a professor of system design at the University of Kassel, Germany.

Krauch was born and died in Heidelberg, Germany.

== Publications (selection) ==
- Computer-Democracy. Düsseldorf Germany, 1972.
- Beginning Science Policy Research in Europe: The Studiengruppe for Systemresearch, 1957–1973 In: Minerva, Volume 44, Number 2, S. 131-142

== Links ==
- https://www.youtube.com/watch?v=Pi7uDVTER4E Helmut Krauch Dokumenta Stirling Motor
- Institut für Technikfolgenabschätzung
- Literature by and about Helmut Krauch in the German National Library catalogue
- 75th birthday 2002 at the University of Kassel (PDF-Datei; 62 kB)
- Abstract by Christopher Freeman about the article "Beginning Science Policy Research in Europe"
- Center for Environmental Systems Research Nachruf
- http://www.cesr.de/
