= Bengt-Åke Lundvall =

Professor of economics

Bengt-Åke Lundvall (born 1941, Sweden) is an emeritus professor in economics at the Department of Business and Management at Aalborg University.

== Biography ==
Lundvall obtained his MA in economics at the University of Gothenburg in 1967.

Lundvall started his academic career at the University of Gothenburg as assistant professor in 1969. In 1973, he moved to the Aalborg University, where he was appointed associate professor. From 1992 to 1995 he was deputy director at OECD Directorate for Science, Technology, and Innovation (DSTI). Since 1995 he is professor at the Department of Business and Management at Aalborg University, where he founded the Innovation, Knowledge and Economic Dynamics Research Group (IKE) 1977.

Lundvall was involved in the organization of Aalborg University during 1973–1977. A turning point in his career was his visit at the SPRU (UK) and Stanford (US) 1984. He was invited to become special invited professor at Tsinghua University in Beijing in 2004-06 and to become visiting professor at Sciences Po in Paris 2007–2010. He has kept a relationship with the top university of China, Tsinghua, over the years.

== Work ==
Lundvall's research is organized around a broad set of issues related to the innovation system (in fact this concept was created by him in 1985) and the learning economy. During 1992-95 he was deputy director at DSTI, OECD. He was involved in the preparation and follow up of the Lisbon Strategy 2000 and onwards. Lundvall has co-ordinated the IKE Group in Aalborg since 1977 and the Danish Research Unit for Industrial Dynamics (DRUID) 1996–2001. Since 2002 he coordinates the worldwide research network Globelics.

In close collaboration with Christopher Freeman, Bengt-Åke Lundvall developed the idea of innovation as an interactive process, in the first half of the eighties and the concept of National System of Innovation in the second half (Lundvall, 1985 and Lundvall, 1988). In the beginning of the nineties he developed the idea of "the learning economy" in collaboration with Björn Johnson (Lundvall and Johnson, 1994).

According to the research carried by Fagerberg & Verspagen (2007) on innovation studies, Lundvall is number 4 in "The most important sources of scholarly inspiration" (only after Schumpeter, Nelson, and Lundvall's mentor Freeman)

== Selected publications ==
Books

- Lundvall, Bengt-Åke. The Learning Economy and the Economics of Hope, Anthem Press, London, 2016.
- Lundvall, Bengt-Åke. Innovation Growth and Social Cohesion, Edward Elgar, London, 2002.
- Archibugi, Daniele, and Lundvall, Bengt-Åke, eds, The Globalizing Learning Economy, Oxford University Press, Oxford, 2001.
- Lundvall, Bengt-Åke, ed. National systems of innovation: Toward a theory of innovation and interactive learning. Pinter Publishers, London, 1992.
- Lundvall, Bengt-Åke. Product innovation and user-producer interaction. Aalborg Universitetsforlag, 1985.

Selected papers.

- Lundvall, Bengt-Åke, and Susana Borrás. "The globalising learning economy: Implications for innovation policy." Report from DG XII, Commission of the European Union (1997): 34-39.
- Lundvall, Bengt-Åke, et al. "National systems of production, innovation and competence building," Research policy 31.2 (2002): 213-231.
- Lundvall, Bengt-Åke and Susana Borrás (2005): Science, Technology and Innovation in The Oxford Handbook of Innovation, ed. Jan Fagerberg and David C. Mowery. Oxford University Press.
- Lundvall, Bengt-Åke. "National innovation systems—analytical concept and development tool." Industry and innovation 14.1 (2007): 95–119.
- Jensen, Morten Berg, et al. "Forms of knowledge and modes of innovation." Research policy 36.5 (2007): 680–693.
