= Luc Soete =

Belgian economist

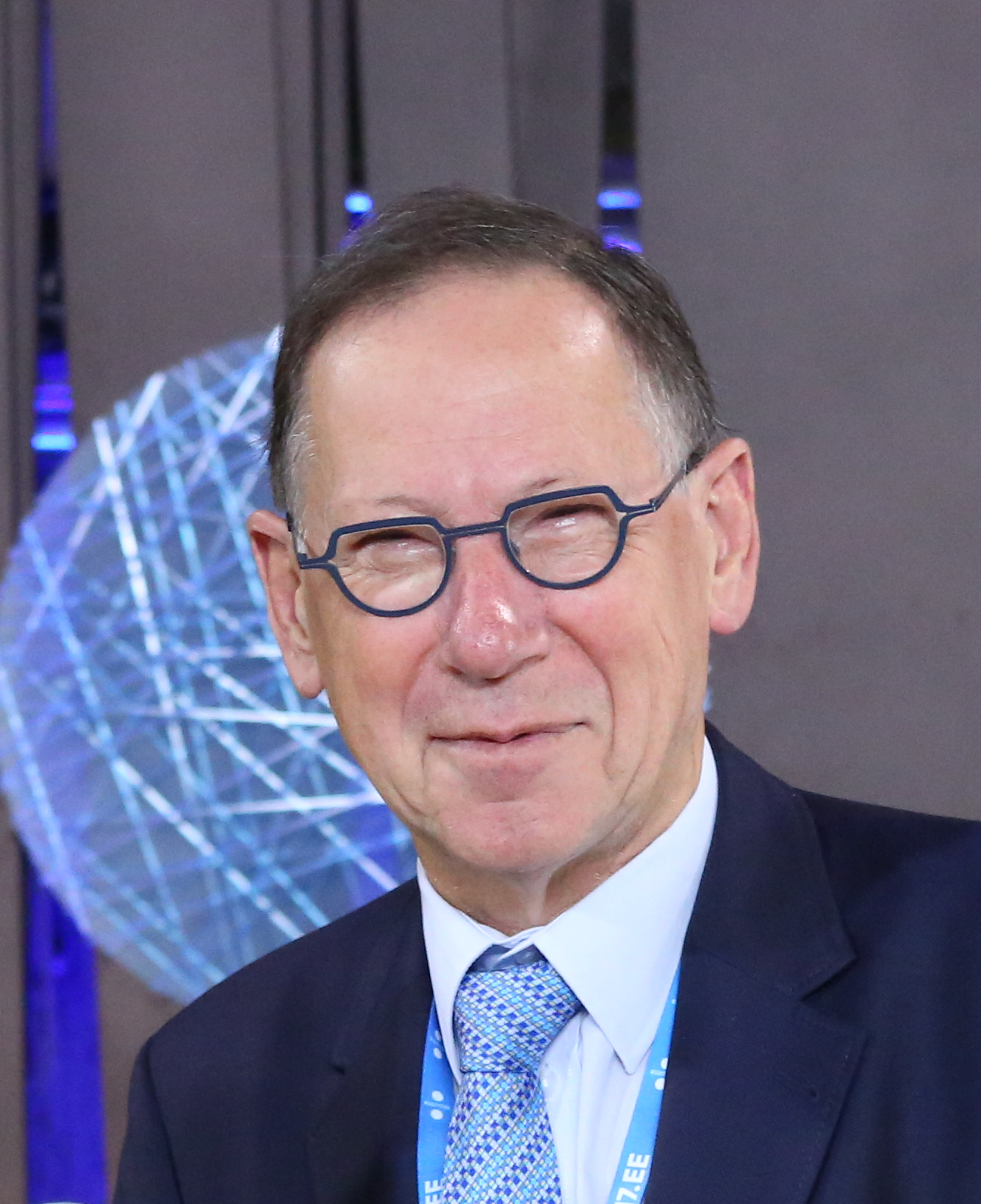
- Luc Soete in 2017
- Born: 15 September 1950 (age 76); Molenbeek-Saint-Jean, Belgium
- Education: University of Sussex
- Occupation: Economist

Luc Soete (born 15 September 1950, Molenbeek-Saint-Jean) is a Belgian economist. He is a Professor and the former Dean of the Brussels School of Governance. He is also a member of the Advisory Board of the University of Sussex Business School and of the Advisory Board of the UNU Institute on Comparative Regional Integration Studies (UNU-CRIS) in Bruges, Belgium. He is a former Rector Magnificus and professor of International Economic Relations at the School of Business and Economics, Maastricht University, and former director of UNU-MERIT, a joint research institute of the United Nations University (UNU) and Maastricht University. Luc Soete is a member of the Dutch scientific advisory body (AWTI) and the Royal Netherlands Academy of Arts and Sciences (KNAW) since 2010. He serves on the Board of Supervisors of the Delft University of Technology.

Luc Soete studied general economic sciences and development economy at Ghent University and started his career as researcher at the Economy Department of the University of Antwerp. In 1978 he obtained his PhD in Economy at the University of Sussex. He has closely worked and co-authored several publications with his mentor Christopher Freeman.

He worked for the Institute of Development Studies and the Science Policy Research Unit (SPRU), both of the University of Sussex, and at the Economy Department of Stanford University. In 1986 he became professor at the Rijksuniversiteit Limburg (now Maastricht University), in Maastricht, the Netherlands, where in 1988 he founded the Maastricht Economic Research Institute on Innovation and Technology (MERIT). In 2006 MERIT merged with the UNU Institute for New Technologies (UNU-INTECH), which had been founded in 1990.

Luc Soete was a member of the Management Board of the Maastricht School of Management (MSM) from 2004 to 2015. In 2010 he was appointed dean of the Maastricht Graduate School of Governance (MGSoG). As of September 2012, Soete served as Rector Magnificus of Maastricht University from 2012 to 2016. Soete has also served as acting vice-director of the Directorate for Science, Technology and Industry (DSTI) of the Organisation for Economic Co-operation and Development (OECD), member of various High Level Expert Groups of the European Commission as well as various expert advisory panels for the Dutch, Belgian and Flemish governments.

Luc Soete received the Belgian Commander of the Order of the Crown in 2006, and an honorary doctorate from Ghent University in 2010.

== Sources ==
- Profile Luc Soete on website UM
