= Knowledge Transfer Partnerships =

UK government-funded programme

- Abbreviation: KTP
- Formation: 1975 Teaching Company Scheme / 2003 Knowledge Transfer Partnerhsips
- Legal status: Government Grant
- Purpose: Knowledge transfer in UK between businesses and universities, colleges, research organisations and Catapults
- Headquarters: Polaris House, North Star Avenue, Swindon, SN2 1FL
- Region served: UK
- Members: 14,000 Teaching Company Sche or Knowledge Transfer Partnerships
- Parent organization: Innovate UK

Knowledge Transfer Partnerships (KTP) is a partly government-funded programme to encourage collaboration between businesses and universities in the United Kingdom.

== History ==
KTP was launched in 2003, replacing the Teaching Company Scheme (TCS), which had been formed in 1975. The programme is funded by some 17 public sector organisations, and led by Innovate UK, an executive non-departmental public body reporting to the Department for Science, Innovation and Technology.

== Structure ==
Each KTP involves three 'partners':

- a company (this may be a private enterprise, public body or voluntary agency)
- a knowledge base (this may be a university or other higher education institution, research organisation or further education college)
- an associate (a recently qualified graduate)

There are approximately 1,000 concurrent programmes at any one time.

The KTP programme is managed by Innovate UK

== Purpose ==
KTPs are tailored to the specific requirements of individual partnerships, each addressing specific needs. Through the placement of highly qualified graduates, businesses gain innovative solutions, new technologies and expertise over 12 to 36 months.

Supported by academic partners, graduates help implement business solutions. KTPs have proven effective, generating over £2 billion for the UK economy from 2010 to 2020, and currently support around 800 businesses, 100 knowledge bases (this could be a university, college, research and technology organisation or Catapult) and over 850 graduates.

As a part-government funded programme, a business entering into a KTP programme contributes between 25 and 50 per cent of the project cost, with the Innovate UK contributing the remainder. Average annual project costs are approximately £80,000. This package includes the associate's salary, as well as a travel budget, personal development budget, academic input and expertise, and administrative support.

== Vacancies ==
Potential KTP associates (suitably qualified graduates or equivalent experience) can search and apply for vacancies on the KTP website. Associates benefit from generous travel and personal development budgets, as well as receiving additional training in business and project management.
