= Business and management research =

Business and management research is a systematic inquiry that helps to solve business problems and contributes to management knowledge. It is an applied research.

Four factors (Easterby-Smith, 2008) combine to make business and management a distinctive focus for research:

- Transdiscipline approach
- Information access is difficult since managers see information as a competitive advantage in the market
- Managers are educated and want some information produced by the classical research method
- Findings must resolve practical management problems

Managers often need information of high quality to help them make the right decisions.

== Research process ==
- Define and clarifying a research topic
- Literature review on this subject
- Research Philosophies
- Formulate research design
- Ethics and access to information
- Defining a sample
- Using Secondary data
- Collecting primary data through observations, questionnaires and interview
- Analysing data
- Draw conclusions from data analysis
- Basic research
- Applied Research

== Magazines & Unions ==
- Journal of Management Studies

== See also ==
- Research
- Market research
- Management science
