= Science Policy Research Unit =

Location
- Jubilee Building, Falmer campus Brighton; United Kingdom

Information
- Type: Public
- Established: 1966; 60 years ago
- Founder: Christopher Freeman
- Director: Jeremy Kent Hall
- Staff: 70
- Publication: Research Policy
- Focus: Policy, Management
- Former Name: Science Policy Research Unit
- Functions: Research, Teaching, Consultancy
- Website: https://www.sussex.ac.uk/spru/

The Science Policy Research Unit (SPRU) is a research centre based at the University of Sussex in Falmer, near Brighton, United Kingdom. Its research focuses on science policy and innovation. SPRU offers MSc courses and PhD research degrees. In 2018, SPRU ranked 3rd in the world and 1st in the UK for top science and technology think tanks on the Global Go To Think Tank Index Report.

== Organization ==
The Science Policy Research Unit is located within the University of Sussex Business School in Brighton, United Kingdom. SPRU's current director is Professor Jeremy Hall, formerly director of the Centre for Social Innovation Management at Surrey Business School and editor-in-chief of the Journal of Engineering and Technology Management. He took over as professor from Johan Schot in September 2019.

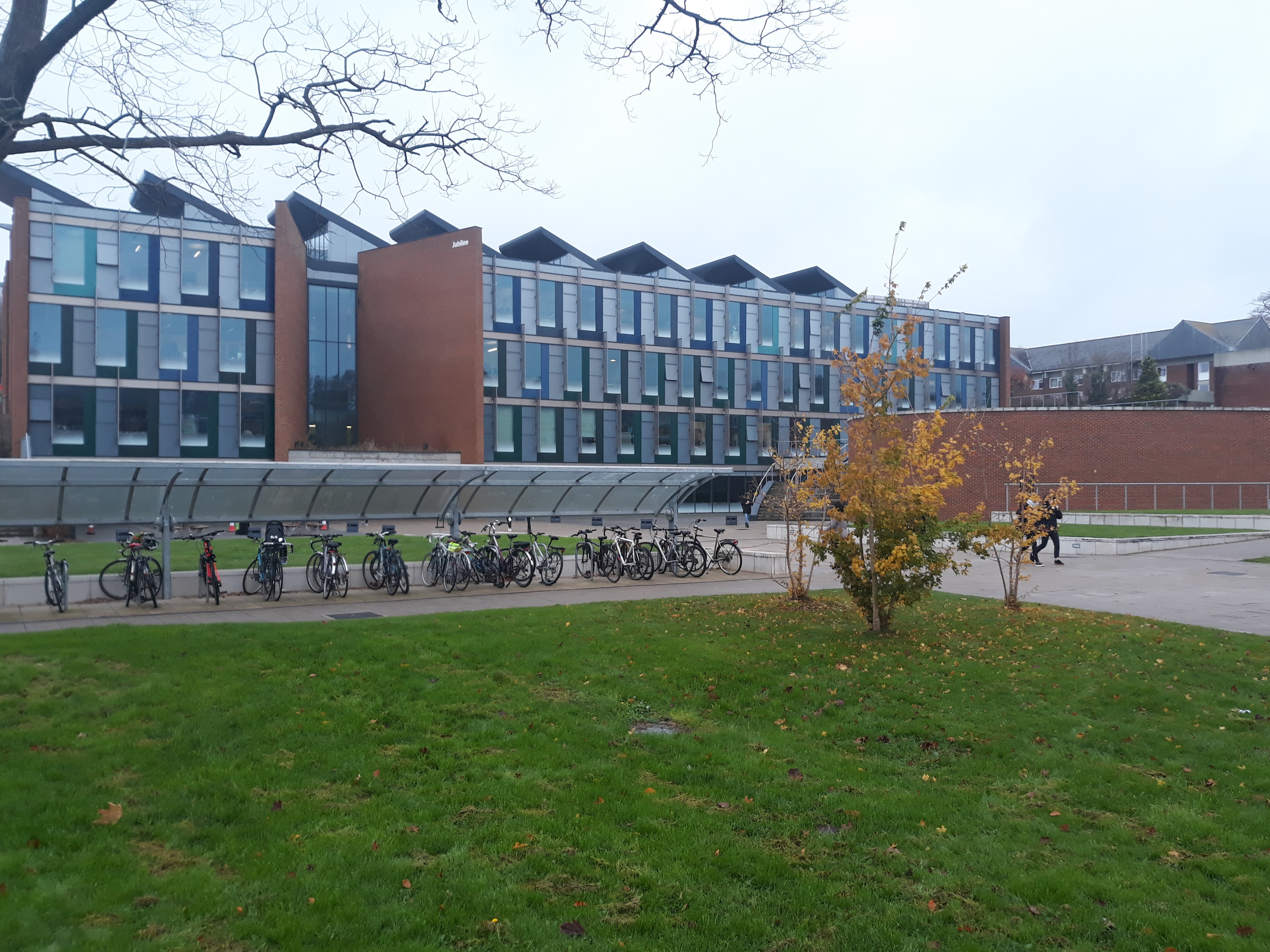
The Jubilee Building, where SPRU is currently based, 2017

SPRU's specialist research centres include:

- Sussex Energy Group (SEG)
- Sussex Sustainability Research Programme (SSRP)
- The STEPS Centre (co-hosted with the Institute of Development Studies)
- Harvard Sussex Program (a long-standing partnership with Harvard University in the field of biological and chemical weapons)
- Creative Industries Policy and Evidence Centre (in partnership with Nesta)
- Centre for Research into Energy Demand Solutions – Digital Society strand
- National Centre for Energy Systems Integration (in partnership with four other research-intensive universities and strategic partner Siemens)
- Transformative Innovation Policy Consortium (TIPC)

== History ==
SPRU was founded in 1966 by Christopher Freeman. Since its foundation, SPRU has had notable scholars among its faculty, including Daniele Archibugi, Giovanni Dosi, Marie Jahoda, Carlota Perez, Keith Pavitt, Mary Kaldor, Richard R. Nelson, Giorgio Sirilli and Luc Soete.

Current faculty members include Benjamin Sovacool; Andy Stirling; Paul Nightingale, director of strategy and operations for the Economic & Social Research Council; Erik Millstone; and Ben Martin, editor of Research Policy and Associate Fellow of Cambridge's Centre for Science and Policy.

Directors

- 1966-1982 Christopher Freeman
- 1982-1992 Geoffrey Oldham
- 1992–1997 Michael Gibbons
- 1997–2004 Ben Martin
- 2004–2006 Michael Gibbons
- 2006–2008 Mick Johnson
- 2008–2013 Gordon MacKerron
- 2014–2018 Johan Schot
- 2019 Jeremy Kent Hall

== Teachings ==
SPRU currently offers six Master's courses, two of which are available online. Additionally, SPRU offers two PhD degrees in Science and Technology Policy Studies and Technology and Innovation Management.

== Harvard Sussex Program ==
The Harvard Sussex Program (HSP) is a collaborative effort on chemical biological weapons disarmament between Harvard University and SPRU at the University of Sussex. It was formed by Matthew Meselson and Julian Perry Robinson to provide research, training, seminars, and information on chemical biological warfare and its disarmament. In 2010, Sussex faculty member Caitriona McLeish was appointed co-director of the HSP.

The program has an archival collection of CBW-related documents at the Sussex Harvard Information Bank (SHIB).

HSP is an academic non-governmental organization (NGO) that has influenced policy creation from within the United States and Great Britain on the formation of the Chemical Weapons Convention (CWC) and reviews of the Biological Weapons Convention (BWC).
