= Dynamic capabilities =

Capability of an organization to adapt its resource base

In organizational theory, dynamic capability is the capability of an organization to purposefully adapt an organization's resource base. The concept was defined by David Teece, Gary Pisano, and Amy Shuen, in their 1997 paper Dynamic Capabilities and Strategic Management, as the firm's ability to engage in adapting, integrating, and reconfiguring internal and external organizational skills, resources, and functional competences to match the requirements of a changing environment. Teece (2007) refined the framework by identifying three clusters of dynamic capability: sensing (the capacity to identify and assess emerging opportunities and threats), seizing (the capacity to mobilise resources and commit investment to address opportunities), and transforming (the capacity to reconfigure the firm's tangible and intangible assets when the competitive environment shifts). With over 67,000 citations, the 1997 paper is among the most cited in the social sciences, and with over 260,000 total Google Scholar citations across his body of work, Teece is the most-cited scholar in business and management worldwide. He was named a Clarivate Citation Laureate in Economics in 2021.

The term is often used in the plural form, dynamic capabilities, emphasizing that the ability to react adequately and timely to external changes requires a combination of multiple capabilities.

== Intellectual foundations ==
The dynamic capabilities framework draws on several intellectual traditions. The evolutionary economics of Nelson and Winter (1982), which modelled firms as entities governed by organisational routines that evolve through variation, selection, and retention, provided the evolutionary foundation. Edith Penrose's The Theory of the Growth of the Firm (1959), which described the firm as a collection of productive resources whose growth depends on entrepreneurial management, provided the resource-based foundation. Joseph Schumpeter's theory of creative destruction (1942), which argued that innovation rather than price competition is the primary driver of economic change, provided the broader economic context.

Teece's own earlier work on the economics of the multiproduct firm (1980, 1982), which explained economies of scope and firm diversification through the redeployment of knowledge-based assets, and his "profiting from innovation" framework (1986), which explained who captures value from innovation through the interaction of appropriability regimes and complementary assets, provided the direct intellectual foundations for the dynamic capabilities concept. The dynamic capabilities framework addresses the question that these earlier contributions left open: how firms sustain value capture not just from a single innovation but across successive innovations over time.

== Overview ==
The phrase "dynamic capabilities" was introduced in a working paper by David Teece, Gary Pisano, and Amy Shuen. The final, peer-reviewed version was published in 1997.

The idea of dynamic capabilities is similar in some ways to the previously existing concept of operational capabilities; the latter pertains to the current operations of an organization, whereas the former, by contrast, refers to an organization's capacity to efficiently and responsively change these operations and develop its resources.

The main assumption of this framework is that an organization's basic competencies should be used to create short-term competitive positions that can be developed into longer-term competitive advantage. Nelson and Winter, in their 1982 book An Evolutionary Theory of Economic Change, link the growth of the concept of dynamic capabilities to the resource-based view of the firm and the concept of "routines" in evolutionary theories of organization. Douma and Scheuder describe it as a bridge between the economics-based strategy literature and evolutionary approaches to organizations.

The resource-based view of the firm emphasizes sustainable competitive advantage; the dynamic capabilities view, on the other hand, focuses more on the issue of competitive survival in response to rapidly changing contemporary business conditions. Strategy scholars Gregory Ludwig and Jon Pemberton, in one of the few empirical studies on the topic, called for clarification of the specific processes of dynamic capability building in particular industries to make the concept more useful to senior managers who set directions for their firms.

Dynamic capabilities theory concerns the development of strategies for senior managers of successful companies to adapt to radical discontinuous change, while maintaining minimum capability standards to ensure competitive survival. For example, industries which have traditionally relied on a specific manufacturing process can't always change this process on short notice when a new technology arrives; when this happens, managers need to adapt their own routines to make the most of their existing resources while simultaneously planning for future process changes as the resources depreciate. Similarly, the kind of changes that the theory is emphasizing are the internal capabilities rather than only looking into the external business forces.

== The sensing, seizing, and transforming framework ==
Teece (2007) provided the most detailed elaboration of the dynamic capabilities framework, identifying specific microfoundations for each of the three capability clusters.

Sensing involves the capacity to scan the competitive environment, identify emerging technological opportunities and competitive threats, and interpret their significance for the firm's strategic position. Sensing capabilities include investment in research and development, monitoring of customer needs and technological developments, and the processes by which information from the periphery of the organisation reaches decision-makers. Firms fail at sensing when organisational hierarchies filter information, when cognitive biases cause managers to interpret new data through the lens of existing strategies, or when internal narratives about the firm's identity suppress signals that do not fit the established self-understanding.

Seizing involves the capacity to mobilise resources, design business models, and commit investment to address the opportunities that sensing has identified. Seizing requires making investment decisions under uncertainty, often before the value of the opportunity can be confirmed. It requires the design of business models that capture value from the innovation, the selection of enterprise boundaries (including decisions about vertical integration, outsourcing, and strategic alliances), and the commitment of financial and organisational resources to a course of action. Firms fail at seizing when decision processes demand excessive certainty before committing, when governance structures give veto power to managers with stakes in existing strategies, or when incrementalism is rewarded over transformative investment.

Transforming involves the capacity to reconfigure the firm's tangible and intangible assets, realign organisational structures, and reshape the firm's culture and routines when the competitive environment demands fundamental change. Transforming is the most difficult dynamic capability because it requires dismantling or modifying the very systems that produce the firm's current performance. This creates what has been described as the adaptation paradox: the tighter the integration of the firm's current activities, the better the current performance but the harder the transformation, because each element of the integrated system reinforces the others and cannot easily be changed in isolation.

Teece argued that these three capabilities are orchestrated by entrepreneurial leadership: the judgment, under conditions of uncertainty, about which opportunities to pursue, how much to invest, when to commit, and when to transform. The dynamic capabilities framework is therefore not a purely organisational theory but one in which managerial agency—particularly the quality of senior leadership—plays a central role in determining whether the organisation can sense, seize, and transform effectively.

=== Ordinary capabilities versus dynamic capabilities ===
Teece distinguished between ordinary capabilities and dynamic capabilities. Ordinary capabilities (also called operational capabilities or zero-order capabilities) enable a firm to perform its current activities efficiently: manufacturing products, serving customers, managing supply chains, and executing established processes. They are the capabilities that produce current performance. Ordinary capabilities can be benchmarked, replicated, and in many cases outsourced; they are necessary for competitive parity but insufficient for sustained competitive advantage in changing environments.

Dynamic capabilities are the higher-order capabilities that enable a firm to change its ordinary capabilities when the competitive environment shifts. They determine the firm's capacity to build new strategic positions when existing ones erode. The distinction has been summarised as the difference between "doing things right" (ordinary capabilities) and "doing the right things" (dynamic capabilities). A firm with excellent ordinary capabilities but weak dynamic capabilities will perform well in a stable environment but will be unable to adapt when conditions change—a pattern consistent with the disruption of firms such as Kodak, Nokia, and Blockbuster, which had strong operational capabilities but could not transform their organisations when their competitive environments shifted fundamentally.

== Relationship to profiting from innovation ==
The dynamic capabilities framework is closely related to Teece's earlier "profiting from innovation" framework (1986), which explains who captures the economic returns from innovation. The profiting from innovation framework demonstrates that the distribution of returns from innovation depends on the appropriability regime (the strength of protections against imitation) and the firm's control of complementary assets (the manufacturing, distribution, and other capabilities required for commercialisation). When appropriability is weak, the firm that controls the bottleneck complementary assets captures the value, regardless of who created the innovation.

The two frameworks address complementary questions. The profiting from innovation framework is relatively static: it explains who captures value from a given innovation at a given moment, based on the current configuration of appropriability and complementary assets. The dynamic capabilities framework is explicitly dynamic: it explains how firms sustain value capture across successive innovations over time, by sensing when the appropriability regime or the complementary asset landscape is shifting, seizing new positions through investment and business model redesign, and transforming their asset configurations in response.

Winter (2006) positioned these contributions within an intellectual lineage from Schumpeter (who identified innovation as the driver of economic change) to Arrow (who identified the appropriability problem) to Teece (who identified the conditions under which appropriability is resolved at the firm level), describing this as a cumulative research programme advancing the economics of innovation.

The New Dynamic Capabilities framework, posed by Amy Shuen in her analysis of Web 2.0, focuses on the firm's ability to quickly orchestrate and reconfigure externally sourced competences, ranging from Apple, Google Android, IBM Linux developer ecosystems to crowdsourced, crowdfunded open innovations such as the Obama08 mobile app—while leveraging internal resources such as platforms, know-how, user communities and digital, social and mobile networks. The New Dynamic Capabilities framework takes into account digital, information and network economics and the fall of the transaction costs of involved in using specialized services. According to Philip Cordes-Berszinn and Basiouni, though, more research is needed in order to measure the "capabilities" and to appropriately apply the ideas to practical management situations.

Dynamic capabilities theory directly enables the design of an organization's business agility, understood as a firm's capabilities structured around specific dimensions of agility, supported by agility enablers and activated by agility drivers. Business agility emphasizes a firm's ability to recognize opportunities and respond rapidly and innovatively to customer demands, market shifts, and competitive pressures.

=== Criticisms and debates ===
Many scholars have argued that the dynamic capabilities framework is vague, tautological, or leads to infinite regress over levels of higher capabilities.

The most influential challenge came from Eisenhardt and Martin (2000), who argued that dynamic capabilities are not the idiosyncratic, firm-specific, path-dependent capabilities that Teece described but rather "best practices" with identifiable common features across firms—such as product development routines, strategic alliance formation, and strategic decision-making processes. If dynamic capabilities have common features, Eisenhardt and Martin argued, they are more imitable than the original framework suggested and therefore cannot be a source of sustained competitive advantage.

Teece (2007, 2014) responded by arguing that Eisenhardt and Martin had conflated ordinary capabilities (operational best practices that can be benchmarked and replicated) with genuine dynamic capabilities (the entrepreneurial capacity to sense, seize, and transform under uncertainty, which is deeply embedded in the firm's history, leadership, and culture and is therefore difficult to imitate). The distinction between ordinary and dynamic capabilities—where the former are necessary for current operations and the latter are necessary for adaptation—was developed in part as a response to this challenge.

Lawson and Samson (2001) suggested that the capabilities identified by the theory are difficult to identify or operationalise, and in some cases those very capabilities can lead to a core capability becoming a core rigidity. Teece has acknowledged that dynamic capabilities are inherently difficult to measure precisely because they involve judgment under uncertainty, but has argued that the difficulty of measurement does not invalidate the concept any more than the difficulty of measuring entrepreneurship invalidates its importance to economic growth.

Wheeler Zahra et al. proposed an operationalization of the dynamic capabilities and to be further tested across different settings and countries. To further clarify concepts related to the dynamic capability and absorptive capacity theories, Wheeler introduced an application derived from the dynamic capability theory for net-enablement. Wheeler's Net-Enabled Business Innovation Cycle facilitates understanding and predicting how firms transform dynamic capabilities associated with net-enablement into customer value using the dynamic capability theory. These net-enabled firms are able to "continually reconfigure their internal and external resources to employ digital networks to exploit business opportunities" through their "routines, knowledge, analysis and rules to create customer value from their net-enablement capability" (p. 128). Accordingly, and based on Wheeler's NEBIC model, Williams have qualitatively developed instruments to measure the dynamic capabilities and Basiouni developed the measurements quantitatively and tested them on many settings and in different countries such as Canada and Saudi Arabia.

== Processes ==
A detailed description of processes and theoretical roots is provided by Arndt, Pierce, and Teece (2017). Teece, Pisano, and Shuen proposed three dynamic capabilities as necessary for an organization to meet new challenges: the ability of employees to learn quickly and to build new strategic assets; the integration of these new strategic assets, including capability, technology and customer feedback, into company processes; and lastly the transformation or reuse of existing assets which have depreciated. Teece refers to successful implementation of these three stages as developing "corporate agility".

=== Learning ===
The first stage, learning, requires employees and managers to reorganize their routines to promote interactions that lead to successful solutions to particular problems, to recognize and avoid dysfunctional activity and strategic blind spots, and to make appropriate use of alliance and acquisition to bring new strategic assets into the firm from external sources. A practical example of this is provided by Jean-Pierre Jeannet and Hein Schreuder, in their book From Coal to Biotech, which lays out how the Dutch company DSM transformed itself twice using 'strategic learning cycles'.

=== New assets ===
In his 1988 book Managing Quality, David A. Garvin states that quality performance depends on organisational routines for gathering and processing information, for linking customer experiences with engineering design choices and for coordinating factories and component suppliers. Increasingly competitive advantage also requires the integration of external activities and technologies through alliances and partnerships.

=== Transformation of existing assets ===
Economists Amit and Schoemaker pointed out in 1993 that success in fast changing markets depends on reconfiguring the firm's asset structure to accomplish rapid internal and external transformation. Firms must develop processes to make changes inexpensively while accomplishing reconfiguration and transformation ahead of the competition. This can be supported by decentralization, local autonomy and strategic alliances.

=== Co-specialization ===
Another "dynamic capabilities" concept is co-specialization. For example, the physical assets, human resources and the intellectual property of a company, having developed together over time, are more valuable in combination than separately, and give a firm a sustainable competitive advantage.

=== Distinction between dynamic capabilities and ordinary capabilities ===
Dynamic capabilities are closely related to the concept of ordinary capabilities as they both are organizational capabilities, yet both are distinct in nature. The resource-based view of the firm and the dynamic capabilities view (DCV) have focused on two broad categories of organizational capabilities that are essential for firm performance: zero-order ordinary capabilities needed to exploit a firm's current strategic assets through day-to-day operations (Winter, 2003) and higher-order dynamic capabilities required to alter a firm's resource base by integrating, building, and reconfiguring competences (Eisenhardt & Martin, 2000; Teece et al., 1997). Qaiyum and Wang (2018) show that ordinary and dynamic capabilities are needed in different contexts.

== See also ==
- Business agility
- Competitive advantage
- David Teece
- Profiting from technological innovation
- Resource-based view
- Strategic management
- Theory of the firm
- Innovation economics
- Organizational economics
- Disruptive innovation
- Evolutionary economics
- Organizational learning
- Creative destruction
