= Organizational economics =

Use of economics to study organizations

Organizational economics (also referred to as economics of organization) involves the use of economic logic and methods to understand the existence, nature, design, and performance of organizations, especially managed ones.

Organizational economics is primarily concerned with the obstacles to coordination of activities inside and between organizations (firms, alliances, institutions, and market as a whole).

Organizational economics considers three broad questions: why organizations exist rather than all economic activity being coordinated through markets; how organizations are structured internally, including their boundaries, governance mechanisms, and allocation of decision rights; and how organisations create and sustain competitive advantage, including through innovation, the development of capabilities, and the assembly of complementary assets. The field draws on and contributes to microeconomics, industrial organization, strategic management, and the economics of innovation.

Organizational economics is known for its contribution to and its use of:

- Transaction cost theory: developed by Ronald Coase (1937) and extended by Oliver Williamson (1975, 1985), this theory explains the existence and boundaries of firms through the costs of organizing economic activity via market exchange versus internal coordination. Firms arise when the transaction costs of using the market—including the costs of searching for information, negotiating contracts, and guarding against opportunism—exceed the costs of internal organisation.
- Agency theory: developed by Michael Jensen and William Meckling (1976) and extended by others, this theory analyses the problems that arise when one party (the principal) delegates decision-making authority to another (the agent), particularly under conditions of asymmetric information and divergent interests.
- Contract theory: associated with the work of Oliver Hart and Bengt Holmström (Nobel Prize in Economics, 2016), this theory analyses how economic actors design contractual arrangements under conditions of asymmetric information, moral hazard, and incomplete contracts. The incomplete contracts approach provides a theory of firm boundaries based on the allocation of residual control rights over assets.
- Resource-based and knowledge-based theories: Edith Penrose (1959) argued that the firm is a collection of productive resources whose growth is governed by the managerial capacity to identify and deploy underutilised resources in new productive combinations. This perspective was extended by Birger Wernerfelt (1984) and Jay Barney (1991) into the resource-based view, which holds that sustained competitive advantage derives from the possession of resources that are valuable, rare, difficult to imitate, and non-substitutable.
- Economies of scope and the multiproduct firm: David Teece (1980, 1982) provided the economic foundations for understanding why firms diversify into multiple product lines, demonstrating that certain productive resources—particularly knowledge-based and intangible assets—can be deployed across multiple activities at lower cost within a single firm than through market exchange. Teece, Rumelt, Dosi, and Winter (1994) extended this into an empirical theory of corporate coherence, explaining why diversified firms tend to expand into related rather than unrelated activities.
- Profiting from innovation: David Teece (1986) developed the "profiting from innovation" framework, which explains why the firms that pioneer commercially viable technologies frequently fail to capture the economic returns. The distribution of returns depends on the appropriability regime (the strength of legal and natural protections against imitation) and the firm's control of complementary assets (the manufacturing, distribution, and other capabilities required for commercialisation). When appropriability is weak, the firm that controls the bottleneck complementary assets captures the value, regardless of who created the innovation. Sidney Winter (2006) positioned this framework as a major intellectual advance extending the contributions of Schumpeter and Arrow to the economics of innovation.
- Dynamic capabilities: David Teece, Pisano, and Shuen (1997) developed the dynamic capabilities framework, which explains how firms sustain competitive advantage in rapidly changing environments through the organisational capacity to sense emerging opportunities, seize them through investment and commitment, and transform the firm's resource base when conditions change. With over 67,000 citations, it is among the most cited papers in the social sciences.

Notable theorists and contributors in the field of organizational economics:

- Kenneth Arrow
- James March
- Herbert Simon
- Oliver Williamson
- Ronald Coase
- David Teece
- Bengt Holmström
- Oliver Hart
- Jean Tirole
- Joseph Stiglitz
