= Giovanni Dosi =

Italian economist (born 1953)

- Born: 25 August 1953 (age 73)

Academic background
- Education: SPRU, University of Sussex
- Influences: Thomas Kuhn, Herbert A. Simon, Christopher Freeman, Sidney Winter, Richard Nelson, Keith Pavitt

Academic work
- Discipline: Innovation Economics, Industrial Organization, Theory of the Firm
- School or tradition: Evolutionary economics
- Notable ideas: Technological paradigm
- Website: Information at IDEAS / RePEc

Giovanni Dosi (born 25 August 1953) is Professor of Economics and Director of the Institute of Economics at the Scuola Superiore Sant'Anna in Pisa. He is the Co-Director of the task forces “Industrial Policy” and “Intellectual Property” at the Initiative for Policy Dialogue at Columbia University. Dosi is Continental European Editor of Industrial and Corporate Change and is included in ISI Highly Cited Researchers.

His major research areas, where he is the author and editor of several works, include economics of innovation and technological change, industrial organization and industrial dynamics, theory of the firm and corporate governance, evolutionary theory, economic growth and development.

A selection of his works has been published in two volumes: Innovation, Organization and Economic Dynamics. Selected Essays, Cheltenham, Edward Elgar, 2000; and Economic Organization, Industrial Dynamics and Development: Selected Essays, Cheltenham, Edward Elgar, 2012.

== Economic analysis ==
Giovanni Dosi's economic analysis is characterized by the contemporaneous attempt to identify empirical regularities and provide micro-foundations consistent with such regularities. As such, his work is a mix of statistical investigations and theoretical efforts.

=== Stylized facts ===
Throughout his work, Dosi and his co-authors have identified some stylized facts as being especially relevant for economic analysis. They are, among others:

S.F.1 Over the 19th-20th century technological innovation has proved to be the major contributor to the economic growth of countries, whose growth rates have however displayed an expanding variance.

S.F.2 The learning processes that firms undertake to carry out innovations are characterized by trials, errors and unexpected success.

S.F.3 Firms are highly heterogeneous in terms of size, productivity, and profitability. In particular, firm sizes display stationary skewed distributions, while productivities and profitabilities display stationary wide supports of their fat tailed distributions.

These facts have led Dosi to point out some theoretical implications, which raise contradictions within Neoclassical economics and bear favourable witness to Evolutionary economics.

=== Technical change ===
The role of technological progress as an explanation of contemporary economic growth (S.F.1) has led Dosi to carefully analyze the nature of technology. In particular, he has suggested an interpretation of technical change resting on the concepts of technological paradigm and technology trajectory.

In analogy with Thomas Kuhn's definition of a scientific paradigm, Dosi has defined a technological paradigm as the general outlook on the productive problems faced by firms. As such, a technological paradigm is composed of some sort of model of the technology at stake (e.g. the model of a microprocessor) and by the specific technological problems posed by such model (e.g. increasing computational capacity, reducing dimensions, etc.). Therefore, technology is identified as a problem-solving activity in which the problems to be solved are selected by the paradigm itself. In this sense, a technological paradigm entails strong prescriptions on the direction of technological change, that is the direction toward which future technical improvements will converge. Such gradual improvements along the specific lines prescribed by the paradigm are what constitute technological trajectories and progress.

Such interpretation of technological change brings Dosi to identify a limited influence of market signals on the direction of technological change. More precisely, in his view, relative prices might affect the direction of technological change only within the boundaries defined by the nature of the technological paradigm. Such an idea can be better understood by analyzing the effect of market signals in their two possible directions: moving "downstream" (i.e. from the technology to the sale of goods) and "upstream" (i.e. from the market environment to the technology).

Going "downstream", from the technology to the sale of goods, market signals enter the picture at opposite stages. First, market signals can act ex ante in the competition among different paradigms: if more paradigms are available, firms will select one or the other according to their expected profitability. However, once a paradigm is affirmed, the direction of technological change would be already implied by its technological prescriptions. Second, market signals can act by selecting ex post those applications of the affirmed paradigm (i.e. the final products) that best fit the market requests. However, at that point, their impact on the direction of technical change would be null since such direction had already been decided by the prescriptions of the affirmed paradigm.

Going "upstream", from the market environment to the technology, market signals act to inform the producers of the technology about variations in relative prices. However, the extent to which technology producers can shift from more expensive to cheaper inputs or modify technology toward the use of cheaper complement goods is bound by technical constraints. Such constraints emerge because inputs are characterized by low substitutability due to the physical and chemical limits involved in the production process. Consequently, the upstream incentives given by market signals affect only the rate of use of certain inputs as well as the rate of development of a trajectory but not the direction of technical change, which is bound by the technical constraints of production.

=== Uncertainty ===
The trial and error procedures adopted by firms to improve along a technological trajectory (S.F.2) have taken Dosi to assess the issue of uncertainty. At a general level, trial and error procedures imply that firms might not be able to forecast completely the outcome of a choice they make; in fact, if they could foresee the error, they would presumably avoid it because it is costly. Such a fact is strongly at odds with any assumption of "perfect rationality" or "farsightedness" on the side of economic agents, which is a foundational element of the Neoclassical approach. Dosi has analyzed this issue by assessing the ways in which economic agents perceive and deal with choices that have an uncertain outcome. In analogy with Herbert A. Simon's distinction about rationality, he has proposed the distinction between substantive uncertainty and procedural uncertainty. In his view, "the former is related to some lack of information about environmental events, while the latter concerns the competence gap in problem-solving". Nonetheless, both of them generate "limitations on the computational and cognitive capabilities of the agents to pursue unambiguously their objectives". Crucially, though, the fact that such types of uncertainties limit the computational rationality of agents leads them precisely to develop routines and decision rules that are the likely explanation of their heterogeneous behaviours. Moreover, even though such routines and decision rules are not optimally determined, they might well prove more "intelligent" than "optimal" decisions especially when applied to turbulent selection landscapes.

=== Heterogeneity ===
The fact that firms appear to be consistently heterogeneous (S.F.3) has brought Dosi to criticize the Neoclassical prediction that firms in an industry converge toward some kind of "optimal" or "representative" characteristic. For such argument to be valid, the characteristics of firms would need to evolve in time toward a normal distribution, possibly showing some shrinking of the support. Notably, this theoretical implication poses an unresolved challenge to the arguments put forward by Milton Friedman in his essay The Methodology of Positive Economics. In that work, Friedman asserted that maximizing behaviour was a reasonable working approximation to describe the choices of economic agents. In fact, even if not all economic agents actually maximize (for example, because some make mistakes), only the "fittest" ones will be selected by the market. Therefore, those agents that actually maximize would be the only "survivors" to market selection, and hence they would gather very closely around the single optimal behaviour. In other words, the tails of the distribution will tend to disappear as the market selects the best "genes", which would turn out to be both "optimal" (in terms of fit to the market selection) and "representative" (since it would be the only surviving type). However, the empirical findings that constitute S.F.3 prove the exact opposite of Friedman's prediction: very different "genes" survive in the market. As a consequence, a realistic representation of economic behaviour should rather allow for firm-specificities, which would explain the heterogeneity found in the data, a point that was made by Richard Nelson and Sidney Winter in their book An Evolutionary Theory of Economic Change.
