= Innovation economics =

Economic theory

Innovation economics is a growing field of economic theory and applied/experimental economics that emphasizes innovation and entrepreneurship. It comprises both the application of any type of innovations, especially technological but not only, into economic use. In classical economics, this is the application of customer new technology into economic use; it could also refer to the field of innovation and experimental economics that refers the new economic science developments that may be considered innovative. In his 1942 book Capitalism, Socialism and Democracy, economist Joseph Schumpeter introduced the notion of an innovation economy. He argued that evolving institutions, entrepreneurs, and technological changes were at the heart of economic growth; however, it is only in the early 21st century that "innovation economy", grounded in Schumpeter's ideas, became a mainstream concept.

== Historical origins ==
Joseph Schumpeter was one of the first and most important scholars who extensively tackled the question of innovation in economics. In contrast to his contemporary John Maynard Keynes, Schumpeter contended that evolving institutions, entrepreneurs and technological change were at the heart of economic growth, not independent forces that are largely unaffected by policy. He argued that "capitalism can only be understood as an evolutionary process of continuous innovation and 'creative destruction.'"

Schumpeter's insights were formalised by Richard Nelson and Sidney Winter in An Evolutionary Theory of Economic Change (1982), which modelled the competitive process as an evolutionary system in which firms' organisational routines undergo variation, selection, and retention. David Teece subsequently extended the Schumpeterian tradition into the theory of the firm and strategic management, developing frameworks that explain not only how innovation drives economic change, as Schumpeter had argued, but who captures the economic value from innovation and how firms sustain their innovative capacity over time. With over 260,000 Google Scholar citations across his body of work, Teece is the most-cited scholar in business and management worldwide and was named a Clarivate Citation Laureate in Economics in 2021.

It is only in the last decade of the 20th century and beginning of the 21st century that a theory and narrative of economic growth focused on innovation that was grounded in Schumpeter's ideas has emerged. Innovation economics attempted to answer the fundamental problem in the puzzle of total factor productivity growth. Continual growth of output could no longer be explained only in increase of inputs used in the production process as understood in industrialization. Hence, innovation economics focused on a theory of economic creativity that would impact the theory of the firm and organization decision-making. Hovering between heterodox economics that emphasized the fragility of conventional assumptions and orthodox economics that ignored the fragility of such assumptions, innovation economics aims for joint didactics between the two. As such, it enlarges the Schumpeterian analyses of new technological system by incorporating new ideas of information and communication technology in the global economy.

Innovation economics emerges from other schools of thought in economics, including new institutional economics, new growth theory, endogenous growth theory, evolutionary economics and neo-Schumpeterian economics. It provides an economic framework that explains and helps support growth in today's knowledge economy. Leading theorists of innovation economics include both formal economists as well as management theorists, technology policy experts and others. These include Paul Romer, Elhanan Helpman, Bronwyn Hall, W. Brian Arthur, Robert Axtell, Richard R. Nelson, Sidney G. Winter, David Teece, Richard Lipsey, Michael Porter, Keun Lee, and Christopher Freeman.

== Theory ==
Innovation economists believe that what primarily drives economic growth in today's knowledge-based economy is not capital accumulation as neoclassical economics asserts, but innovative capacity spurred by appropriable knowledge and technological externalities. Economic growth in innovation economics is the end-product of:

- knowledge (tacit vs. codified);
- regimes and policies allowing for entrepreneurship and innovation (i.e. R&D expenditures, permits and licenses);
- technological spillovers and externalities between collaborative firms; and
- systems of innovation that create innovative environments (i.e. clusters, agglomerations and metropolitan areas).

In 1970, economist Milton Friedman said in The New York Times that a business's sole purpose is to generate profits for their shareholders, and companies that pursued other missions would be less competitive, resulting in fewer benefits to owners, employees, and society; however, 21st-century data shows that while profits matter, good firms supply far more, particularly in bringing innovation to the market. This fosters economic growth, employment gains, and other society-wide benefits. Business school professor David Ahlstrom asserts that "the main goal of business is to develop new and innovative goods and services that generate economic growth while delivering benefits to society."

Economic thought	Focus	Growth	Context
Neoclassical	Market price signals in using scarce resources	Productive factor accumulation (capital, labor)	Individuals and firms behaving in vacuum
Innovation	Innovative capacity and free enterprise to create more effective processes, products, business models	Knowledge/technology (R&D, patents)	Institutions of research, government, society

In contrast to neoclassical economics, innovation economics offer differing perspectives on main focus, reasons for economic growth and the assumptions of context between economic actors. Despite the differences in economic thought, both perspectives are based on the same core premise, namely the foundation of all economic growth is the optimization of the utilization of factors and the measure of success is how well the factor utilization is optimized. Whatever the factors, it nonetheless leads to the same situation of special endowments, varying relative prices and production processes. Thus, while the two differ in theoretical concepts, innovation economics can find fertile ground in mainstream economics, rather than remain in diametric contention.

== Evidence ==
Empirical evidence worldwide points to a positive link between technological innovation and economic performance. For instance:

- The drive of innovation in Germany was due to the R&D subsidies to joint projects, network partners and close cognitive distance of collaborative partners within a cluster. These factors increased patent performance in various industries such as biotech.
- Innovation capacity explains much of the GDP growth in India and China between 1981 and 2004, but especially in the 1990s. Their development of a National Innovation System through heavy investment of R&D expenditures and personnel, patents and high-tech/service exports strengthened their innovation capacity. By linking the science sector with the business sector, establishing incentives for innovative activities and balancing the import of technology and indigenous R&D effort, both countries experienced rapid economic growth in recent decades.
- The Council of Foreign Relations also asserted that since the end of the 1970s the U.S. has gained a disproportionate share of the world's wealth through their aggressive pursuit of technological change, demonstrating that technological innovation is a central catalyst of steady economic performance.

Concisely, evidence shows that innovation contributes to steady economic growth and rise in per capita income; however, some empirical studies investigating the innovation-performance-link lead to rather mixed results and indicate that the relationship is more subtle and complex than commonly assumed. In particular, the relationship between innovativeness and performance seems to differ in intensity and significance across empirical contexts, environmental circumstances and conceptual dimensions. This has taken place in an era of data constraint as identified by Zvi Griliches in the 1990s. Because the primary domain of innovation is commerce, the key data resides there, continually out of campus reach in reports hidden within factories, corporate offices and technical centers. This recusal still stymies progress today. Recent attempts at data transference have led not least to the positive link being upgraded to exact algebra between R&D productivity and GDP, allowing prediction from one to the other. This is pending further disclosure from commercial sources, but several pertinent documents are already available.

== Value capture from innovation ==
A central question in innovation economics is not only how innovation generates economic growth but who captures the economic returns from innovation. This question was first systematically addressed by David Teece in his "Profiting from technological innovation" framework (1986), which has become one of the most cited papers in technology management and innovation studies.

Teece observed that the firms and nations that pioneer commercially viable technologies frequently fail to capture the economic returns. British firms pioneered the CT scanner (EMI), the civilian jet aircraft (de Havilland), and nuclear power, yet lost market leadership to American and later Japanese competitors. American firms pioneered the VCR (Ampex), colour television (RCA), and numerous semiconductor technologies, yet Japanese firms captured the dominant market positions. The pattern recurs across industries and eras: technological leadership does not reliably translate into commercial success.

The framework explains this pattern through two key concepts. The first is the appropriability regime: the combination of legal protections (such as patents and trade secrets) and the nature of the technology (such as its tacitness and complexity) that determines how easily an innovation can be imitated. In strong appropriability regimes, the innovator can protect its position; in weak regimes, competitors can replicate the innovation quickly.

The second concept is complementary assets: the manufacturing capabilities, distribution networks, service organisations, brand assets, and other resources required to commercialise an innovation and bring it to market. Teece demonstrated that when appropriability is weak, the distribution of returns from innovation is determined by who controls the critical complementary assets. The innovating firm captures value only if it owns or effectively controls these assets; otherwise, the returns flow to whichever firm controls the bottleneck on the path to market.

The framework has been extended to the digital economy (Teece, 2018), where appropriability regimes are typically weak because software and digital products can be replicated at near-zero marginal cost, making control of complementary assets—including data, cloud infrastructure, platform ecosystems, and customer relationships—even more decisive for value capture. In the artificial intelligence economy, the framework predicts that value will be captured not primarily by the firms that develop the most capable AI models, which are rapidly commoditising, but by the firms that control the complementary assets required for AI deployment: enterprise distribution channels, cloud computing infrastructure, proprietary data, and regulatory compliance capabilities.

Kenneth Arrow's (1962) seminal analysis had identified the fundamental problem of appropriating returns from invention, noting that information, once produced, can be used by others at negligible cost. Sidney Winter (2006) positioned Teece's profiting from innovation framework as the major intellectual advance that resolved this problem, extending the contributions of both Schumpeter and Arrow by identifying the specific conditions under which innovators can and cannot capture value.

== Dynamic capabilities and the innovative firm ==
Innovation economics addresses not only the macroeconomic conditions that foster innovation but also the firm-level capabilities that enable sustained innovation over time. The dynamic capabilities framework, developed by Teece, Pisano, and Shuen (1997), provides the most widely cited account of how firms sustain competitive advantage in innovation-driven environments.

The framework identifies three clusters of organisational capability. Sensing is the capacity to scan the environment, identify emerging technological opportunities and competitive threats, and interpret their significance. Seizing is the capacity to mobilise resources, design business models, and commit investment to address the identified opportunities. Transforming is the capacity to reconfigure the firm's asset base, organisational structure, and strategic direction when the competitive environment changes.

Dynamic capabilities are distinct from the ordinary operational capabilities that enable a firm to perform its current activities efficiently. Ordinary capabilities can be benchmarked and replicated; dynamic capabilities are embedded in the firm's history, leadership, culture, and organisational processes, making them difficult to imitate and a source of sustained competitive advantage. The framework addresses a limitation of both the resource-based view and the profiting from innovation model: both are relatively static, explaining competitive advantage at a point in time but not how firms sustain advantage through successive waves of technological change. Dynamic capabilities provide the dynamic complement, explaining how firms sense when the appropriability regime or the complementary asset landscape is shifting, and how they reconfigure their resources in response.

Nelson and Winter (1982) had established the evolutionary foundations by modelling firms as entities governed by organisational routines that evolve through variation and selection. The dynamic capabilities framework extends this by explaining how managerial agency—particularly entrepreneurial leadership—shapes the evolution of routines rather than leaving it to the quasi-automatic process that evolutionary models sometimes imply.

With over 67,000 citations, the dynamic capabilities paper (Teece, Pisano, and Shuen, 1997) is among the most cited in the social sciences. Together with the profiting from innovation framework, it constitutes a comprehensive theory of innovation at the firm level: profiting from innovation explains who captures value from a given innovation; dynamic capabilities explain who sustains value capture across successive innovations over time.

== Innovation and competition policy ==
Innovation economics has significant implications for competition policy. The standard framework for antitrust analysis, derived from the structure–conduct–performance paradigm of industrial organization economics, evaluates competition by defining markets, measuring market share and concentration, and assessing whether dominant firms exercise market power to the detriment of consumers. This framework was developed primarily for industries producing commodity products where firms compete on price within stable markets.

Innovation economists have argued that this framework produces misleading results when applied to innovation-driven industries, where firms compete not by offering the same product at a lower price but by creating fundamentally new products that make existing ones obsolete—the process Schumpeter termed creative destruction. In dynamically competitive markets, high market share may reflect successful innovation rather than anticompetitive market power, and dominant positions are typically temporary because the next wave of innovation displaces the current leader. Teece has argued that competition policy should distinguish between market power acquired through innovation, which is procompetitive and benefits consumers, and market power acquired through foreclosure of competitors, which is anticompetitive.

The Profiting from Innovation framework has direct implications for merger policy and the analysis of vertical integration. When innovating firms integrate vertically to secure control of complementary assets, the conduct may be procompetitive—enabling the firm to commercialise innovations that fragmented market relationships could not deliver—rather than anticompetitive foreclosure of competitors. Gilbert (2006) and Hovenkamp (2021) have documented the influence of innovation economics on the regulatory treatment of cooperative R&D arrangements and strategic alliances, noting that research in this area contributed to antitrust authorities becoming more receptive to collaborative innovation agreements.

== Geography ==
While innovation is important, it is not a happenstance occurrence as a natural harbor or natural resources are but a deliberate and concerted effort of markets, institutions, policymakers, and effective use of geographic space. In global economic restructuring, location has become a key element in establishing competitive advantage as regions focus on their unique assets to spur innovation (i.e. information technology in Silicon Valley, or digital media in Seoul). Even more, thriving metropolitan economies that carry multiple clusters (i.e. Tokyo, Chicago, and London) essentially fuel national economies through their pools of human capital, innovation, quality places, and infrastructure. Cities become "innovative spaces" and "cradles of creativity" as drivers of innovation. They become essential to the system of innovation through the supply side as ready, available, abundant capital and labor, good infrastructure for productive activities, and diversified production structures that spawn synergies and hence innovation. In addition, they grow due to the demand side as diverse population of varying occupations, ideas and skills, high and differentiated level of consumer demand, and constant recreation of urban order especially infrastructure of streets, water systems, energy, and transportation.

== Worldwide examples ==
- Automotive engineering in Baden-Württemberg, Germany
- Biotechnology in Genome Valley in Hyderabad, India, Boston, Massachusetts, and San Francisco, California
- Digital media technologies in Digital Media City in Seoul, South Korea
- Energy companies in Energy Corridor in Houston, Texas
- Financial products and services in New York City
- Fintechs and Cyber Security in Belfast in Northern Ireland
- High-technology and life sciences in Research Triangle Park in North Carolina
- Nanotechnology in Tech Valley, New York (College of Nanoscale Science and Engineering)
- Precision engineering in South Yorkshire, United Kingdom
- Petrochemical complexes in Rio de Janeiro, Brazil
- Semiconductors and information technology in Silicon Valley in California
- Start-up Nation, Israel
- Train locomotive and rolling stock manufacturing in Beijing, China

== See also ==
- Business cluster
- Creative destruction
- Dynamic capabilities
- Economic development
- Evolutionary economics
- Innovation system
- Keynesian economics
- Knowledge economy
- Innovation
- Global Innovation Index
- Metropolitan economy
- Richard R. Nelson
- Neoclassical economics
- Neo-Schumpeterian economics
- Profiting from technological innovation
- Resource-based view
- Joseph Schumpeter
- David Teece
- Theory of the firm
