= International Joseph A. Schumpeter Society =

Economics research association

The International Joseph A. Schumpeter Society (ISS) is an economics association aimed at furthering research in the spirit of Joseph Schumpeter. Wolfgang F. Stolper and Horst Hanusch initiated the foundation of the society in 1986.

The primary objective of the International Joseph Alois Schumpeter Society is the advancement of knowledge in the broad research area of the dynamics of structural change, its origins, and its effects. These topics include studies addressing the role of the dynamic entrepreneur, the political and social problems of entrepreneurship, entrepreneurial history as well as research question concerning income distribution, technical change, and employment. The society welcomes scientifically sound and non-ideological research by scholars of all scholarly traditions. Following Joseph Schumpeter, research should respect "facts as they are and behave and not as one wishes them to be or behave."

The ISS organizes a biannual conference on topics that mirror Schumpeterian ideas, helps financing international conferences, and promotes the dissemination of research through conference proceedings and other publications. Recent scholarly contributions related to Schumpeter are awarded with academic prizes by the ISS. In 1993 the Society adopted the Journal of Evolutionary Economics, founded in 1991, as its house journal.

== Presidents ==
- Patrick Llerena, France (2024-2026);
- Maureen McKelvey, Sweden (2022-2024);
- Yao Ouyang, P. R. China (2021-2022);
- Massimo Egidi, Italy (2018–2020);
- Keun Lee, South Korea (2016–2018);
- Jorge Niosi, Canada (2014–2016);
- Uwe Cantner, Germany (2012–2014);
- John Foster, Australia (2010–2012);
- Esben S. Andersen, Denmark (2008–2010);
- Maria da Graça Derengowski Fonseca, Brazil (2006–2008);
- Jean-Luc Gaffard, France (2004–2006);
- Franco Malerba, Italy (2002–2004);
- Robert F. Lanzillotti, USA (2000–2002);
- J. Stanley Metcalfe, United Kingdom (1998–2000);
- Dennis C. Mueller, Austria (1996–1998);
- Gunnar K. Eliasson, Sweden (1994–1996);
- Ernst Helmstaedter, Germany (1992–1994);
- Yuichi Shionoya, Japan (1990–1992);
- F. M. Scherer, USA (1988–1990);
- Arnold Heertje, The Netherlands (1986–1988)

== Schumpeter Prize ==
The ISS awards the Schumpeter Prize to distinguished academics in the broad research area of innovation. The following researchers have been awarded with the Schumpeter Prize:

Year	Awardees
1988	Christopher Freeman: "Technology Policy and Economic Performance: Lessons from Japan", Pinter Press/Columbia University Press,1987
1990	W. Brian Arthur: "Positive feedback mechanisms in the economy", in: Scientific American, Feb. 1990; Joel Mokyr: "The Lever of Riches: Technical Creativity and Economic Progress", Oxford University Press 1990; Manuel Trajtenberg: "Economic Analysis of Product Innovation: The Case of the CT Scanners", Harvard University Press 1989.
1992	Richard Musgrave: "Schumpeter's Crisis of the Tax State. An Essay in Fiscal Sociology", in: Journal of Evolutionary Economics, Volume 2, No. 2, 1992. Christopher Green: "From 'Tax State' to 'Debt State'", in: Journal of Evolutionary Economics, Volume 3, No. 1, 1993.
1994	Elias Dinopoulos: "Schumpeterian Growth Theory: An Overview", in: Osaka City University Economic Review, vol. 29, No. 1-2, pp. 1–21, January 1994 Jean Fan: "Endogenous Technical Progress, R&D Periods and Durations of Business Cycles", in: Journal of Evolutionary Economics, Volume 5, No. 4, 1995
1996	Maureen D. McKelvey: "Evolutionary innovations: The business of biotechnology", Oxford University Press, 1996
1998	Masahiko Aoki: "Towards a comparative institutional analysis" Frank R. Lichtenberg: "Pharmaceutical innovation as a process of creative destruction" Honorary prize: Mancur Olson: " Capitalism and democracy in the 21st century. Capitalism, socialism and dictatorship"
2000	Brian J. Loasby: "Knowledge, Institutions and Evolution in Economics", Routledge, 1999 Jason Potts: "The New Evolutionary Microeconomics. Complexity, Competence and Adaptive Behaviour", Edward Elgar
2002	Steven Klepper: "The Evolution of the U.S. Automobile Industry and Detroit as its Capital"
2004	J. Peter Murmann: "Knowledge and Competitive Advantage. The Coevolution of Firms, Technology, and National Institutions”
2006	Philippe Aghion and Rachel Griffith: "Competition and Growth. Reconciling Theory and Evidence", MIT Press, 2005 Richard G. Lipsey, Kenneth I. Carlaw and Clifford T. Bekar: "Economic Transformations and Long-Term Economic Growth", Oxford University Press, 2005 Richard N. Langlois: "The Dynamics of Industrial Capitalism: Schumpeter, Chandler and the New Economy", London, Routledge, 2006
2008	Martin Fransman: "The New ICT Ecosystem: Implications for Europe", Kokoro, 2007 Mario Amendola and Jean-Luc Gaffard: "The Market Way to Riches: Behind the Myth", Edward Elgar, Cheltenham, 2006 Thomas McCraw: "Prophet of Innovation: Joseph Schumpeter and Creative Destruction", Harvard University Press, Cambridge, MA and London, 2007
2010	Bart Nootebomm: "A cognitive theory of the firm. Learning, governance and dynamic capabilities", Edward Elgar, Cheltenham 2009 William Lazonick: "Sustainable prosperity in the new economy?", W.E Upjon Institute Michigan, 2009
2012	Franco Malerba, Richard Nelson, Luigi Orsenigo, and Sidney Winter: "Innovation and the evolution of industries: history friendly models"
2014	Geoffrey M. Hodgson: "Conceptualizing Capitalism – Institutions, Evolution, Future", to be published by University of Chicago Press in 2015 Keun Lee: "Schumpeterian Analysis of Economic Catch-up", Cambridge University Press, 2013
2016	Dengjian Jin: “The Great Knowledge Transcendence: The Rise of Western Science and Technology Reframed” (London and New York: Palgrave Macmillan, 2016) Shane Greenstein: “How the Internet Became Commercial; Innovation, Privatization, and the Birth of a New Network (Princeton NJ and Oxford UK: Princeton University Press, 2015)
2018	Michael H. Best: “How Growth really happens” (Princeton University Press, 2018) John A. Mathews: “Global Green Shift” (Anthem Press, 2017)
2020	Hiroshi Shimizu: “General Purpose Technology, Spin-Out, and Innovation: Technological Development of Laser Diodes in the United States and Japan” (Springer, 2019)
2022	Michael Peneder: “Schumpeter's Venture Money" (Oxford University Press, 2021)
