= Dopfer =

Dopfer is a German surname. Notable people with the name include:

- Fritz Dopfer (1987), German former World Cup alpine ski racer
- Kurt Dopfer, Austrian-born Swiss economist
- Sandra Dopfer (1970), former Austrian tennis player
