= Keun Lee =

South Korean economist (born 1959)

- Born: 1959 (age 66–67)
- Occupations: Economist and academic

Academic background
- Education: B.A., Economics; Ph.D., Economics
- Alma mater: Seoul National University; University of California, Berkeley

Academic work
- Institutions: Chung-Ang University; Seoul National University

Korean name
- Hangul: 이근
- RR: I Geun
- MR: I Kŭn

Keun Lee (Korean: 이근; born 1959) is a South Korean economist and an academic. He is a distinguished professor at Chung-Ang University and Seoul National University (emeritus).

Lee's research has been focused in the areas of development economics, economics of innovation, corporate growth and innovation, and industry studies for emerging economies. He was awarded the Schumpeter Prize by the International Schumpeter Society in 2014 and the Kapp Prize by the European Association for Evolutionary Political Economy in 2019. He is also a fellow of the Canadian Institute for Advanced Research (CIFAR).

== Education ==
Lee completed a B.A in Economics from Seoul National University in 1983 and earned a Ph.D. in Economics from the University of California, Berkeley in 1989.

== Career ==
Lee's academic career included being appointed as assistant professor at Seoul National University from 1992 to 1997. In 1997, he was promoted to associate professor there and remained in the post until 2002. From 1992 to 2025, he was a professor at Seoul National University, and following this appointment, he was named a distinguished professor at Chung-Ang University as well as a distinguished emeritus professor at Seoul National University.

Lee's has been a consultant for the Development Research Group at the World Bank, as well as a council member for the World Economic Forum and a member of the Committee for Development Policy at the United Nations. He was also appointed vice-chairman for the National Economic Advisory Council for the President of Korea, and from 2016 to 2018, was the president of the International Schumpeter Society. He is also the president of the Korean Economic Association. and an editor for the journal Research Policy.

== Research ==
Lee's research on emerging economies explained that in a time of disruptive technological change or new opportunities, companies in developing countries are able to challenge leading firms that are located in developed countries by skipping or leap-frogging over the technological paradigms and creating new trajectories. This theory was elaborated further in the book Economic Catch-Up and Technological Leapfrogging: The Path to Development and Macroeconomic Stability in Korea. The book favored the leapfrog method of development over traditional methods of path-following and provided an analysis of capacity-building and economic catch-up. He and Malerba also elaborated the catch-up cycle framework and proposed that the catching-up cycle consisted of four distinct stages: entry, gradual catch-up, forging ahead, and falling behind. However, in Schumpeterian Analysis of Economic Catch-up: Knowledge, Path-Creation, and the Middle-Income Trap, he proposed that the prospects of catching up by developing countries are limited since some of these might experience the middle-income trap. The book was described as a "seminal" work and an integrated synthesis of latecomer's development paths and innovation systems that can be pursued by developing countries, although it was highlighted that the analysis lacked an explanation of the interactions between country, sector, and firm levels innovation systems.

Lee investigated the impact of technological and scientific knowledge on economic growth in developing countries and found scientific knowledge to be insignificantly related to economic growth, whereas technological knowledge led to positive economic growth. Along with Eom, he highlighted some of the determinants of innovations based on the university-industry linkages in South Korea and found that SME collaborations with other organizations is an important factor in knowledge-based economies. Moreover, in his book, Chinese Firms and the State in Transition Property Rights and Agency Problems in the Reform Era, he provided an analysis for understanding economic reforms in Chinese state enterprises. However, it was pointed out that the book did not explore the impact of social dimensions on Chinese economic efficiency.

Lee's later work proposed that latecomer economies may easily catch up with previous industrial leaders when techno-economical and socio-institutional changes are present. This analysis was also detailed in The Art of Economic Catch-Up: Barriers, Detours and Leapfrogging in Innovation Systems, which was praised as a "pleasant" and "well-accessible" view on economic development. However, the book was criticized for generalizing some of the factors responsible for economic growth in Asian economies and overlooking the context of economic development. In research related to the fourth Industrial Revolution (4IR) and the role of technologies, he demonstrated that adopting new technologies and business models from the 4IR can increase the pace of development for emerging economies while also leveraging economic uncertainty to their advantage. In another collaborative study, he found that few Chinese firms have been able to successfully transform themselves from original equipment manufacturer (OEM) to original brand manufacturer (OBM). In 2024, he authored Innovation-Development Detours for Latecomers: Managing Global–Local Interfaces in the De-Globalization Era, in which he provided an analysis on how developing economies can use technological innovation to their advantage in a de-globalization era. The book was reviewed by Elizabeth Thurbon, who described it as 'masterful' and a 'foundational text in development studies'.

== Awards and honors ==
- 2014 – Schumpeter Award, International Schumpeter Society
- 2019 – Fellow, Canadian Institute for Advanced Research
- 2019 – Kapp Prize, European Association for Evolutionary Political Economy
- 2023 – Fellow, Eurasian Business & Economics Society
- 2024 – REPE Prize, Review of Evolutionary Political Economy

== Bibliography ==
=== Books ===
- Lee, Keun (1991). Chinese Firms and the State in Transition: Property Rights and Agency Problems in the Reform Era (First ed.). London: Taylor and Francis. ISBN 978-1138045651.
- Lee, Keun (1993). New East Asian Economic Development: The Interaction of Capitalism and Socialism. Taylor and Francis. ISBN 978-1563242182.
- Lee, Keun (2013). Schumpeterian Analysis of Economic Catch-up: Knowledge, Path-creation, and the Middle-income Trap. Cambridge: Cambridge University Press. ISBN 978-1107042681.
- Lee, Keun (2016). Economic Catch-up and Technological Leapfrogging: The Path to Development and Macroeconomic Stability in Korea. Cheltenham, UK: Edward Elgar Publishing. ISBN 978-1785367922.
- Lee, Keun (2019). The Art of Economic Catch-up: Barriers Detours and Leapfrogging in Innovation Systems. Cambridge University Press. ISBN 978-1108472876.
- Lee, Keun (2021). China's Technological Leapfrogging and Economic Catch-up: a Schumpeterian Perspective (First ed.). Oxford University Press. ISBN 978-0192847560.
- Lee, Keun (2024). Innovation-development Detours for Latecomers: Managing Global-local Interfaces in the De-globalization Era. Cambridge, United Kingdom: Cambridge University Press. ISBN 978-1009456265.

=== Selected articles ===
- Lee, Keun; Lim, Chaisung (2001). "Technological regimes, catching-up and leapfrogging: findings from the Korean industries". Research Policy. 30 (3): 459–483. doi:10.1016/S0048-7333(00)00088-3. ISSN 0048-7333.
- Mu, Qing; Lee, Keun (2005). "Knowledge diffusion, market segmentation and technological catch-up: The case of the telecommunication industry in China". Research Policy. 34 (6): 759–783. doi:10.1016/j.respol.2005.02.007. ISSN 0048-7333.
- Lee, Keun; Kim, Byung-Yeon (2009). "Both Institutions and Policies Matter but Differently for Different Income Groups of Countries: Determinants of Long-Run Economic Growth Revisited". World Development. 37 (3): 533–549. doi:10.1016/j.worlddev.2008.07.004. ISSN 0305-750X.
- Kim, Yee Kyoung; Lee, Keun; Park, Walter G.; Choo, Kineung (2012). "Appropriate intellectual property protection and economic growth in countries at different levels of development". Research Policy. 41 (2): 358–375. doi:10.1016/j.respol.2011.09.003. ISSN 0048-7333.
- Lee, Keun; Malerba, Franco (2017). "Catch-up cycles and changes in industrial leadership:Windows of opportunity and responses of firms and countries in the evolution of sectoral systems". Research Policy. 46 (2): 338–351. doi:10.1016/j.respol.2016.09.006. ISSN 0048-7333.
