= Jason Potts (economist) =

New Zealand economist

- Awards: Fellow of the Academy of the Social Sciences in Australia (2017)

Academic background
- Thesis: First principles of evolutionary microeconomics (1999)

Jason Potts is a New Zealand-born academic economist. His work focuses on the theoretical development of evolutionary economics using complex systems theory. His current research is on the role of creative industries in innovation-driven economic growth and development. He is also a leading researcher on the economics of blockchains and is currently the Director of the Blockchain Innovation Hub, housed at RMIT University. Building on the work of Elinor Ostrom, Potts has developed the concept of the innovation commons. Potts received his B.Com (Hons, Economics) from the University of Otago, NZ, (1993), and his PhD (Economics), from Lincoln University, New Zealand (1999). His highest cited work is his book, The New Evolutionary Microeconomics, at over 700 times, according to Google Scholar.

== Books ==
- Potts' first book The New Evolutionary Microeconomics: Complexity, Competence and Adaptive Behaviour (Edward Elgar) received the Schumpeter Prize in 2000 (joint award with Brian Loasby). He also wrote The General Theory of Economic Evolution with Kurt Dopfer, published by Routledge in 2007. His latest book is 'Evolutionary economics and creative industries' (Edward Elgar).

== Selected publications ==
- Dopfer K, Potts J (eds) (forthcoming) Evolutionary Microeconomics; Evolutionary Mesoeconomics; Evolutionary Macroeconomics (three vols.). Elgar Critical Library, Edward Elgar.
- Goorha, Prateek, Potts, J. (2019) Creativity and Innovation: A New Theory of Ideas. Palgrave.
- Hartley, J., Potts, J. Cunningham, S., Banks, J., Keane, M. (2012) Key Words in Creative Industries. Routledge.
- Potts, J. (2011) Creative Industries and Economic Evolution. Edward Elgar [translated into Chinese and republished by Xiamen University Press, 2013]
- Dopfer, K., J. Potts (2008) The General Theory of Economic Evolution. Routledge. [translated into Russian and Japanese]
- Potts, J. (2000) The New Evolutionary Microeconomics: Complexity, Competence and Adaptive Behaviour. Edward Elgar. [Joint winner with Brian Loasby of the 2000 Schumpeter Prize.]

== See also ==
- Kurt Dopfer
