= Business agility =

While organizational agility focuses on the continuous redefinition and adaptation of a company's strategic direction for value creation in long horizon, business agility is the subset of organizational agility, which is externally driven and outcome-focused, emphasizing a firm's ability to recognize opportunities and respond swiftly and innovatively to customer demands, market shifts, and competitive pressures. Business agility can be sustained by maintaining and adapting the goods and services offered to meet with customer demands, adjusting to the marketplace changes in a business environment, and taking advantage of available human resources.

Business agility, grounded in dynamic capabilities theory, refers to a company's capabilities structured around specific agility dimensions, supported by agility enablers and activated by agility drivers.

In a business context, agility is the ability of an organization to rapidly adapt to market and environmental changes in productive and cost-effective ways. An extension of this concept is the agile enterprise, which refers to an organization that uses key principles of complex adaptive systems and complexity science to achieve success. Business agility is the outcome of organizational intelligence.

== Overview ==
Businesses which lack adaptability may be left paralyzed when faced with changing markets and environments. To counter this, business agility can be developed in the enterprise, making change a routine part of organizational life. An agile enterprise may be able to nimbly adjust to and take advantage of emerging opportunities in a perpetually changing environment. The agile enterprise can be viewed as an integral component of a larger system whose activities produce a ripple effect of change within both the enterprise itself and the broader system.

The discipline of enterprise architecture supports business agility through techniques including layering, separation of concerns, architecture frameworks, and the separation of dynamic and stable components. The model of hierarchical complexity—a framework for scoring the complexity of behavior—has been adapted to describe the stages of complexity in enterprise architecture.

One type of enterprise architecture that supports agility is a non-hierarchical organization without a single point of control. In such an organization, individuals function autonomously, constantly interact with each other to define the organization's vision and aims, maintain a common understanding of requirements, and monitor the work that needs to be done. Roles and responsibilities are not predetermined but in flux, and emerge from individuals' self-organizing activities. Projects are generated across in the enterprise and sometimes from outside affiliates. Key decisions are made collaboratively, on the spot, and on the fly. Because of this, knowledge, power, and intelligence are spread through the enterprise, making it capable of quickly recovering and adapting to the loss of any key enterprise component.

In business, projects can be complex with uncertain outcomes and goals that can change over time. Traditionally these issues were dealt with by planning experts who would attempt to pre-determine every possible detail prior to implementation; however, in many situations, even the most carefully conceived projects will be impossibly difficult to manage. Agile techniques, originating from the software development community, represent an alternative approach to the classic prescriptive planning approaches to management. The main focus of agile methods is to address the issues of complexity, uncertainty, and dynamic goals, by making planning and execution work in parallel rather than in sequence to eliminate unnecessary planning activity, and the resulting unnecessary work.

Pragmatic methods for achieving organizational agility should start from an organization's competitive bases and the organization's mission, vision, and values. Agile methods integrate planning with execution, allowing an organization to find an optimal ordering of work tasks and to adjust to changing requirements. The major causes of chaos on a project include an incomplete understanding of project components, incomplete understanding of component interactions, and changing requirements. Sometimes requirements change as a greater understanding of the project components unfolds over time. Requirements also change due to the changing needs and wants of the stakeholders. The agile approach allows a team or organization of collective trust, competence, and motivation to implement successful projects quickly by focusing on only a small set of details in any change iteration. This is in contrast to non-agile in which all the details necessary for completion are generally taken to be foreseeable and have equal priority inside of one large iteration.

== History ==
A concept of "agility" as an attribute of business organizations arose in response to the requirements of modern business to operate in predictable ways in the face of extreme complexity. In particular, software development organizations have created a specific set of techniques known as agile methods to address the problems of changing requirements, uncertain outcomes due to technological complexity, and uncertain system dynamics due to overall system complexity. Some of the ideas that have shaped thinking in the agile community arose from the studies of complexity science and the notion of complex adaptive systems (CAS).

As with CAS, the outcomes or products of agile organizations such as software teams are inherently unpredictable yet will eventually form an identifiable pattern. Despite their unpredictability, agile enterprises are thought to be best positioned to take advantage of hypercompetitive external environments.

Agile enterprises exist in corporate (e.g. W. L. Gore & Associates and Oticon), non-profit (e.g. Alcoholics Anonymous), community (e.g., Wikipedia, the Burning Man festival), and even terrorist (e.g. Al Qaeda) environments.

== Topics in agile enterprise studies ==
=== Comparison with complex systems ===
Interactions, self-organizing, co-evolution, and the edge of chaos are concepts borrowed from complexity science that can help define some of the processes that take place within an agile enterprise.

Interactions are exchanges among individuals, etc. holding a common vision and possessing the necessary resources, behaviors, competence, and experience in aggregate. They are an important driving force for agile enterprises, because new ideas, products, services, and solutions emerge from the multiple exchanges happening over time. The interactions themselves, rather than individuals or the external environment, are significant drivers of innovation and change in an agile enterprise.

Self-organizing describes the spontaneous, unchoreographed, feedback-driven exchanges that are often found within agile enterprises. Vital initiatives within the agile enterprise are not always managed by one single person; rather all parties involved collectively make decisions without guidance or management from an outside source. The creativity and innovation that arises from this self-organizing process give the agile enterprise an edge in developing (and redeveloping) products, services, and solutions for a hypercompetitive marketplace.

Co-evolution is a key process through which the enterprise learns from experience and adapts. The agile enterprise is constantly evolving in concert with (and in reaction to) external environmental factors. Products and services are in a constant state of change, because, once launched, they encounter competitors' products, regulators, suppliers, and customer responses that force adaptations. In one sense, nothing is ever completely "finished," although this does not mean that nothing is ever made, produced, or launched.

The edge of chaos is a borderline region that lies between complete anarchy or randomness and a state of punctuated equilibrium. The agile enterprise ideally operates in this region, needing the tension between constant change and the constraints that weaken change efforts to keep the organization perturbed enough for innovation and success. In other words, the edge of chaos is the space in which self-organizing and co-evolution flourish.

=== Comparison with bureaucracies ===
There are several key distinctions between the agile enterprise and the traditional bureaucratic organization.

The most notable is the agile enterprise's use of fluid role definitions that allow for dynamic decision-making structures. Unlike the rigid hierarchies which characterize traditional bureaucracies, organizational structures within agile enterprises are more likely to fluidly adapt to changing business conditions, forming them into structures that support the current direction and any emergent competitive advantage.

Similarly, agile enterprises do not adhere to the concept of sustained competitive advantage that typifies the bureaucratic organization. Operating in hypercompetitive, continuously changing markets, agile enterprises pursue a series of temporary competitive advantages—capitalizing for a time on the strength of an idea, product, or service then readily discarding it when no longer tenable.

Lastly, the agile enterprise is populated with individuals pursuing serial incompetence; they work hard to obtain a certain level of proficiency in one area but are driven to move on to the next "new" area to develop expertise. There are no subject-matter experts specializing for years in one topical area, as found typically in a traditional bureaucracy.

=== Operating at the edge of chaos ===
Although agile enterprises by definition include numerous constantly co-evolving and moving parts, they do require some structure.

The enterprise must develop specific structures (also called system constraints) to serve as a counterbalance to randomness and anarchy, keeping the enterprise optimally functioning on the edge of chaos. These structures including a shared purpose or vision, resource management aids, reward systems, and shared operating platforms. These often emerge from three key organizational processes: strategizing, organizing, and mobilizing.

Strategizing is an experimental process for the agile enterprise, in which individuals repeatedly generate ideas (exploration), identify ways to capitalize on ideas (exploitation), nimbly respond to environmental feedback (adaptation), and move on to the next idea (exit).

Organizing is an ongoing activity to develop structures and communication methods that promote serial execution. It often includes defining a shared vision, as well as systems and platforms, that ground the enterprise.

Mobilizing involves managing resources, ensuring the fluid movement of people between projects, and finding ways to enhance internal and external interactions. Typically, enterprise values, personal accountability, and motivational and reward systems are a key output of this process.

== See also ==
- Agile software development
- Complex systems
- Complexity
- Cynefin framework
- Emergence
- Holacracy
- Participatory organization
- Self-organization
- Spontaneous order
- Wikinomics
