= Kurt Dopfer =

Swiss economist

Kurt Dopfer is an Austrian-born Swiss economist who has served since 1980 as Professor of Economics at the University of St. Gallen in Switzerland, where he held the chair of international economics and development theory. He has been Co-director of the university’s Institute of Economics, a member of the University Senate, and a researcher for the Swiss National Science Foundation. He has also held visiting professorships at the International Christian University in Tokyo, the Technical University of Dresden, the University of Vienna, the University of Queensland in Brisbane, and the Institute for Advanced Studies in Vienna, and served as a commission member of the Austrian Academy of Sciences. Dopfer has published several books and numerous scholarly articles in multiple languages. He has served on the editorial boards of academic journals, including the Journal of Evolutionary Economics, and has been a board member of academic associations such as the International Joseph A. Schumpeter Society, the European Association for Evolutionary Political Economy, and the Ausschuss für Evolutorische Ökonomik of the German Economic Association.

Dopfer is noted for his work in evolutionary economics, particularly his efforts to develop an axiomatic framework for evolutionary economic theory (Dopfer 2001, 2005). In later work (Dopfer 2004), he argued that the concept of homo oeconomicus should be replaced by a model of rule-based behaviour, described as homo sapiens oeconomicus. With co-authors John Foster and Jason Potts, Dopfer has also advanced the development of mesoeconomics, an analytical level situated between micro- and macro-economics (Dopfer, Foster & Potts 2004). The meso level is described as the domain in which collective behavioural patterns emerge, diffuse, and become stabilised as technological or institutional regimes. It functions as an intermediary that links micro-level interactions with macro-level economic dynamics.

== See also ==
- Mesoeconomics

== Publications ==
- Kurt Dopfer 'Evolutionary Economics: Framework for analysis', in: K. Dopfer, ed. 2001. Evolutionary Economics: Program and Scope, Recent Economic Thought Series, Boston/Dordrecht/London: Kluwer Academic Publishers, pp. 1–44.
- Kurt Dopfer, John Foster, & Jason Potts, 2004. 'Micro-meso-macro,' Journal of Evolutionary Economics, Springer, vol. 14(3), pp. 263–279. (abstract)
- Kurt Dopfer, 2004. 'The economic agent as rule maker and rule user: Homo Sapiens Oeconomicus,' Journal of Evolutionary Economics, Springer, vol. 14(2), pp. 177–195.
- Kurt Dopfer, 2012. ‘The Origins of Meso Economics. Schumpeter’s Legacy and Beyond´, Journal of Evolutionary Economics, Springer, vol. (22), pp. 133–160.
- Kurt Dopfer, Jason Potts (2008) The General Theory of Economic Evolution. London: Routledge.
- Kurt Dopfer, 2005/2006. ’Evolutionary Economics: A Theoretical Framework’. In: The Evolutionary Foundations of Economics, ed. K. Dopfer. Cambridge: Cambridge University Press.
- Kurt Dopfer, Jason Potts (eds.) 2014. Evolutionary Microeconomics; Evolutionary Mesoeconomics; Evolutionary Macroeconomics (three vols.). Elgar Critical Library, Cheltenham: Edward Elgar. ‘Evolutionary Economics: A Theoretical Framework’. In: The Evolutionary Foundations of Economics, ed. K. Dopfer. Cambridge: Cambridge University Press.
