= Mesoeconomics =

Study of structural economics

Mesoeconomics or Mezzoeconomics is a neologism used to describe the study of economic arrangements which are not based either on the microeconomics of buying and selling and supply and demand, nor on the macroeconomic reasoning of aggregate totals of demand, but on the importance of the structures under which these forces play out, and how to measure these effects. Mesoeconomics, as a science, began to take shape back in the 19th century. Among the researchers, the most notable contribution to the development of problems of regional economic theory, issues of the location of production forces and the efficiency of regional production was made by German economists - Johann Heinrich Thünen, Alfred Weber, Walter Kristaller, August Lesch, professor of economics at the University of Pennsylvania Walter Isard, French economist Jean Chardonnay, American economist of Russian origin Vasily Leontiev, V. Thompson, T. Palander, as well as the authors of the famous textbooks H. Armstrong and J. Taylor. Among Soviet researchers of the first half of the 20th century, G.M. Krzhizhanovsky, I.G. Alexandrova, V.V. Kuibyshev, N.N. Nasrudin Nasri, who dealt with long-term planning and economic zoning. Among the Russian scientists of the second half of the 20th century, research in the field of regional distribution, the creation of territorial production complexes and the efficiency of regional production: T.S. Khachaturova, Ya.G. Feigina, N.N. Nekrasov, A.G. Granberg, P.M. Alampieva, E.B. Alaeva, K.N. Bedrintseva, G.I. Granik, F.D. Zastavny, R.S. Livshits, K.I. Klimenko, Yu.K. Kozlova, A.M. Korneeva, V.V. Kistanova, A.G. Omarovsky, N.N. Oznobina, V.F. Pavlenko, M.M. Palamarchuk, Yu.G. Saushkina, E. D. Silaeva, N.I. Shraga and V.M. Torosov. Several books on this topic, including the book by V.M. Torosov. "Mesoeconomics" (regional. Economics) of 2004 ("The best scientific book of Russia in 2004", devoted to the problems of economics [1]), Mann 2011 [2] and Eng 1987, [3] most accurately determine the field of application of mesoeconomics. As of 2014, 474 articles and books have been written on this topic.

Mesoeconomics is not a generally recognized term, in contrast with microeconomics or macroeconomics. Several books on this topic including Mann in 2011 and Ng in 1987 help define the scope of mesoeconomics. Scholarly articles on the topic are starting to increase in number with 474 articles and books on the topic in a database search in July, 2014. The term Mesoeconomics is still emerging and should be used with restraint due to unfamiliarity with most audiences.

The term comes from "meso-" (which means "middle") and "economics", and is constructed in analogy with micro and macro economics.

== Mesoeconomic reasoning ==
Economics focuses on measurable ways of describing social behavior. In orthodox neoclassical economics, there are two main recognized types of economic thinking - microeconomics, which focuses on the actions of individual buyers and sellers in response to signals sent by the supply and demand ratio to establish production and allocate resources, and macroeconomics, which focuses on how the economy generally goes through cycles of activity and how the various large industries relate to each other.

Mesoeconomic thinking argues that the country's economy is not a two-, but a three-tier structure. The regional economy has not only its own "floor", its own research area, but, accordingly, its own range of problems and a system of indicators (for example, gross regional product, etc.). This means that the search for the efficiency of the country's economy should be carried out not only at the level of enterprises and the state, but also at the level of regions.

By regions, mesoeconomics does not always mean an administrative-territorial unit (as V. Leontyev and W. Izard believe). N.N. Nekrasov believes that in this case a region should be understood as a large territory of the country with more or less homogeneous natural conditions, and mainly - a characteristic orientation of production forces. L. James and J. Martin adhere to the same point of view.

Economics focuses on measurable ways of describing social behavior. In orthodox neoclassical synthesis economics, there are two main kinds of recognized economic thinking – micro-economics, which focuses on the action of individual buyers and sellers responding to signals sent by price to set production and distribution of effort, and macroeconomics, which focuses on how whole economies go through cycles of activity, and how different large aggregate sectors relate to each other.

Mesoeconomic thinking argues that there are important structures which are not reflected in price signals and supply and demand curves, nor in the large economic measures of inflation, Gross Domestic Product, the unemployment rate, and other measures of aggregate demand and savings.

The argument is that the intermediate scale creates effects which need to be described using different measurements, mathematical formalisms and ideas.

== Criticisms of mesoeconomics ==
While many economists using the term use game theory and evolutionary economic concepts, the converse is not recognized to be the case: there are many who dispute the need for a meso scale theory of economics, arguing instead that rational expectations at infinity can appropriately model price strategies. Notable examples of this line of thinking include Robert J. Barro and Thomas Schelling. (See also Time horizon, Ricardian equivalence.)

== Individuals associated with mesoeconomics ==
- Yew-Kwang Ng – He uses the term in 1986 to describe a hybrid of micro and macro analysis, with elements of general equilibrium.
- Markos Mamalakis – He has written several papers on mesoeconomics and development, particularly in Latin America.
- Stuart Holland – Author of a 1987 book which argued that market economics was moving from a micro to a meso paradigm
- He-ling Shi – Advanced a theory that business cycles are the result of mesoeconomic behavior, and not based purely on aggregate demand and real interest rates as implied by General equilibrium and neoclassical economics.
- Niclas Andersson – Associated with analysis of the construction sector using the mesoeconomics of sectors.
- Kurt Dopfer – Argues that the failure to link micro and macro economics shows that there is a need for a meso level of economic thinking based on evolutionary concepts.
- Richard Parker (economist) – Historian of economics who has been a proponent of the need for a mesoeconomic scale in association with Stuart Holland.

== Bibliography ==
- Dictionary Definition of Meso-. Vol. 4, The American Heritage Dictionary of the English Language, 2004.
- Dopfer, Kurt. "The Origins of Meso Economics Schumpeter's Legacy." In The Papers on Economics and Evolution. Jena, Germany: Evolutionary Economics Group 2006.
- Dopfer, Kurt; Foster, John and Potts, Jason. "Micro-Meso-Macro." Journal of Evolutionary Economics 14 (2004): 263–279.
- Dopfer, Kurt; Potts, Jason. "The General Theory of Economic Evolution." London; New York: Routledge (2008).
- Khanya-aicdd. Sustainable Livelihoods Principles, 2006. Available from https://web.archive.org/web/20080521221017/http://www.khanya-aicdd.org/site_files/index.asp?pid=54.
- Mamalakis, Markos J. . "Poverty and Inequaliy in Latin America: Mesoeconomic Dimensions of Justice and Entitlements." Journal of Interamerican Studies and World Affairs 38, no. 2/3 (1996 ): 181–199.
- Popov, Evgeny V. "Minieconomics as a Separate Part of Microeconomics " Atlantic Economic Journal 33, no. 133 (2005).
- Walz-Chojnacki, Greg. Markos Mamalakis: The Man Behind 'Mesoeconomics' University of Wisconsin 2006 [cited 8 November 2006]. Available from https://web.archive.org/web/20071011045733/http://www.uwm.edu/News/report/old/april99/people.html.
