= Uwe Cantner =

German economist

Uwe Cantner (born August 2, 1960) is a German economist.

== Current positions ==
Since 2000, Uwe Cantner has been full professor of economics at the University of Jena, and heads the chair of Economics and Microeconomics. Economics of innovation, evolutionary economics, industrial economics, and productivity and efficiency measurement are his major fields of research.

Since 2011, he is also Professor of Economics (part-time) at the University of Southern Denmark.

On 15 October 2014, he became vice-president for young researchers and diversity management at Friedrich Schiller University Jena.

Since 2015 he is member of the Expert Commission on Research and Innovation of the German Government. He chairs this commission since May 2019.

== Education ==
Uwe Cantner earned a Master of Arts in economics from Wayne State University in 1984 and a Diplom from the University of Augsburg in 1985.

He received his PhD in 1990 from LMU Munich with the thesis "Product and Process Innovation in International Trade".

In 1996, he habilitated at the University of Augsburg on the topic "Heterogeneity and Spillovers - Basic Elements of a Theory of Technological Change".

== Further positions ==
Uwe Cantner is the director of The Jena Graduate School Human Behaviour in Social and Economic Change, and the spokesman of the (formerly DFG) Graduate College “The Economics of Innovative Change, offered jointly by Friedrich Schiller University Jena and Max Planck Institute of Economics Jena in Germany.

He was the president of International Joseph A. Schumpeter Society from 2012 to 2014.

Since 2002 he has been editor of Journal of Evolutionary Economics.
