= Hiroshi Shimizu (professor) =

Japanese management scholar

Hiroshi Shimizu (born May 29, 1973) is a Japanese management scholar, specializing in innovation and entrepreneurship research. He is currently a professor at the School of Commerce, Waseda University.

== Career ==
Shimizu was born in Yokohama, Kanagawa Prefecture, Japan in 1973.

He graduated from the Faculty of Commerce, Chuo University in 1997 and went on to study for a master's degree in commerce at Hitotsubashi University, where he completed his studies in 1999. After studying at Northwestern University's Graduate School of History Department, he studied at the London School of Economics and Political Science, where he obtained his Ph.D. in 2007 (Economic History).

After working as a post-doctoral fellow at Eindhoven University of Technology, he became a full-time lecturer at the Institute of Innovation Research, Hitotsubashi University in 2008. Associate Professor in 2011 and Professor in 2017 at the same school. Professor, School of Commerce and Management, Waseda University, in 2012.

== Awards ==
He was awarded the 59th Nikkei and Economic Book Culture Award in 2016. The award was established by the Nikkei to contribute to the advancement of scholarship and knowledge in the fields of economics and management/accounting, as well as its general dissemination and application.

In 2017 he won the 33rd Takamiya Prize by The Academic Association for Organizational Science in Japan.

In 2021, he received the Schumpeter Prize from the International Schumpeter Society for his book, General Purpose Technology, Spin-Out, and Innovation: Technological Development of Laser Diodes in the United States and Japan

In 2026, he was awarded The Commendation for Science and Technology by the Minister of Education, Culture, Sports, Science and Technology, Awards for Science and Technology

== Publications ==
- Hiroshi Shimizu,(2019) General Purpose Technology, Spin-Out, and Innovation: Technological Development of Laser Diodes in the United States and Japan, Springer.
