= Markos Mamalakis =

Greek economist (1932–2024)

Markos John Mamalakis (Greek: Μάρκος Μαμαλάκης; 30 October 1932 – 10 July 2024) was a Greek economist who specialised in development economics, particularly in Latin America.

== Life and career ==
Born in Salonika, he graduated from the Experimental High School of the Aristotle University of Thessaloniki in 1950, then attended the law school of the university and received a B.A. in Law, with the distinction summa cum laude in 1955. He did graduate work at the Ludwig-Maximilians-Universität München (LMU) from 1955 to 1957, and University of California, Berkeley from 1957 to 1962, where he received his M.A. (1959), and PhD (1962) with a dissertation entitled Inflation and Growth: An Asset Preference Analysis. With a Case Study of the Chilean Inflation. He has taught or been a visiting scholar at the University of California, Berkeley; University of Western Ontario; Universidad de Chile; Yale; University of Göttingen; Woodrow Wilson International Center for Scholars; Inter-American Development Bank; and the University of Giessen.

He was a professor of economics at the University of Wisconsin–Milwaukee.

Mamalakis was one of the first to argue that there is no "magic bullet" to development, but that development solutions must take into account the effects and circumstances of the location. He has published widely on macroeconomics in developing economies and welfare and sector effects. He argued for the fruitfulness of a mesoeconomic analysis of social interactions, rather than a strictly microeconomic or macroeconomic approach.

Mamalakis was a father of 12. He and his wife celebrated their 50th wedding anniversary on 31 January 2010. He died on 10 July 2024, at the age of 91.
