= Technology trajectory =

Technology trajectory refers to a single branch in the evolution of a technological design of a product/service, with nodes representing separate designs. With Technology trajectory referring to a single branch we do expect the development of new technologies to precede recent uses and advance future technologies. The development of future technologies allows for the innovation of new ideas, research, and much more. It also can be defined as the paths by which innovations in a given field occur.

Movement along the technology trajectory is associated with research and development. Due to the institutionalization of ideas, markets, and professions, technology development can get 'stuck' (locked-in) within one trajectory, and firms and engineers are unable to adapt to ideas and innovation from the outside. Technological trajectory/development may break- out of trajectory and can cause three understandings 1. when technology will lock in into a trajectory, 2.) when technology may break out of lock-in, and 3.) when competing technologies may co-exist in a balance. A lock-in is when a certain technology develops along a certain trajectory allowing the development to get stuck due to certain circumstances. Not all trajectories are permanently locked into a trajectory. Let us take for example the Technological Advancement/Trajectory of Increasing Resource use. In 1929 after a man who worked for the USGS wanted to make sure there were enough materials and technological advancements after the war on metal production. He considered 4 important factors to make sure metal production would be made: Geology, Technology, Economics, and Politics. There are technical factors that go into mining, treatment, and refining. “The history of sulfur extraction and production technology also reflects continuous improvement upon processes developed from other industries to meet changing materials use requirements and societal needs". The process of sulfur extraction is found deep underground or underwater. The Clean Air Act of 1970 made rules for getting sulfur from oil refining, processing of sulfide, ores, and even the combustion of electricity generation. This required technologies to be made in order to coincide with the Clean Air Act.

The continuous improvement of sulfur extraction over the years shows how this technological trajectory/ advancement has developed over the years.

Technology Trajectory doesn't just focus on firms or engineers but it can deal with healthcare, schools, the daily life of everyone, and much more. Technology Trajectory also poses the question of whether innovations are integrated into systems nationally, regionally, or sectorally. This then makes you wonder about the environmental issues and the structure of how Technology trajectory affects everyone. Technology in this day in age is all around us and with that being said we must have a Technology Trajectory of where we want to advance to maintain our ability to take technology beyond our imagination. Technology is shaping how we learn, gather information, move forward, and change. Technology is like a policy because it tells us how we are supposed to do things, and makes some ways of doing things more rational and practical than others.

See also

- Innovation
- Thomas Samuel Kuhn
- Social shaping of technology
- Technological paradigm
