= Gary Pisano =

American economist

Gary P. Pisano is an American economist. He is currently the Harry E. Figgie Professor of Business Administration at Harvard Business School.

== Education ==
- Ph.D., Business Administration, University of California, Berkeley, 1988
- B.A., magna cum laude, Economics (with distinction), Yale University, 1983
