= Richard R. Nelson =

American economist (1930–2025)

- Born: May 4, 1930; New York City, U.S.
- Died: January 28, 2025 (aged 94)
- Spouse: Katherine Nelson (died 8/18)

Academic background
- Education: Oberlin College; Yale University

Academic work
- Discipline: Evolutionary economics
- School or tradition: Evolutionary economics
- Institutions: Columbia University

Richard R. Nelson (May 4, 1930 – January 28, 2025) was an American economist and academic who was professor of economics at Columbia University. He was one of the leading figures in the revival of evolutionary economics thanks to his seminal book An Evolutionary Theory of Economic Change (1982) written jointly with Sidney G. Winter. He was also known for his work on industry, economic growth, the theory of the firm, and technical change. The book he edited, National innovation systems: A comparative analysis (1996) is one of the most influential in innovation studies. Nelson died on January 28, 2025, at the age of 94.

== Education and early work ==
Nelson gained a B.A. at Oberlin College in 1952, and a Ph.D. at. Yale University in 1956.

== Career ==
=== Roles ===
Nelson worked as

- Assistant Professor, Oberlin College - 1957,
- Research Economist and analyst, the RAND Corporation - 1957–1960, 1964–1968,
- Associate Professor, Carnegie Institute of Technology - 1960–1961,
- Staff Senior Member, Council of Economic Advisors (under President John F. Kennedy) - 1961–1963,
- Professor of Economics, Yale University - 1968–1986,
- Director, Institute for Social and Policy Studies, Yale University - 1980–1986,
- Professor, Columbia University, 1986 – 2005,
- Director, Program on Science, Technology and Global Development, Columbia Earth Institute, 2005.

Nelson was the George Blumenthal Professor Emeritus of International and Public Affairs, Business, and Law, and the director of the Program on Science, Technology and Global Development at Columbia's The Earth Institute. He was also a part-time faculty in the Manchester Institute of Innovation Research (MIoIR, formerly known as PREST), University of Manchester. Previously he was professor at Oberlin College, Carnegie Mellon University, and Yale University (1968–1986) where he was the director of the Institute for Social and Policy Studies (1981–1986).

Nelson cooperated with Erik Reinert and his heterodox economics network The Other Canon Foundation.

=== Work ===
==== Difficult public policy issues ====
In 1977 Nelson wrote an essay, The Moon and the Ghetto: An Essay on Public Policy Analysis, which asked "If we can put a man on the moon, why can't we solve the problem of the ghetto?" He argued that public policy progress was often hampered by the partial, and often faulty, conceptualisation of problems and solutions by the different decision-making parties. Economists, public policy experts and technologists all understand problems within their own terms of reference, and thus challenge the validity of other perspectives. This leads to muddling of values and facts, and to internecine policy warfare. Nelson recommended open-minded dialogue and a sequential, experimental approach to hard problems.

==== Technological paradigms ====
In 2008 Nelson wrote on “technological paradigms”. He believed the power of these varied greatly across fields of practice, in the sense that in certain field's progress has been much more rapid than in others where comparable resources have been applied to the effort. He proposed that one important factor in this is the extent to which the technology in a field is controllable and replicable. Another factor is the strength of the supporting sciences. He argued that these factors are strongly intertwined with the causal arrows going both ways.

=== Awards ===
Nelson won various awards. In 2005 he was awarded the Leontief Prize presented by the Global Development and Environment Institute at Tufts University. In 2006 he became the 27th laureate of the Honda Prize.

== Books ==
- (co-editor with Jan Fagerberg and David Mowery) The Oxford Handbook of Innovation (2005) ISBN 0-19-928680-9
- (editor), National Innovation Systems: A Comparative Analysis (1993)
- Understanding Technical Change as an Evolutionary Process (1987) ISBN 0-674-01916-4
- (co-author with Sidney G. Winter), An Evolutionary Theory of Economic Change (1982) ISBN 0-674-27228-5
- The Moon and the Ghetto (1977) ISBN 978-0-393-09173-1
