= Sidney G. Winter =

American economist

- Born: Sidney Graham Winter; 1935 (age 90–91); Iowa City, Iowa, U.S.
- Spouse: Alice Rivlin (m. 1989)

Academic work
- Discipline: Evolutionary economics
- School or tradition: Evolutionary economics
- Website: Information at IDEAS / RePEc

Sidney Graham Winter (born 1935, in Iowa City, Iowa) is an American economist and professor emeritus of management at the Wharton School, University of Pennsylvania. He is recognized as a leading figure in the revival of evolutionary economics.

In 1982, he co-published with Richard R. Nelson An Evolutionary Theory of Economic Change, a book which has since been cited more than 50,000 times.

Winter was Chief Economist of the US General Accounting Office (1989–1993). He won the Viipuri Prize for Strategic Management in 2008.

Winter was the second husband and widower of economist Alice Mitchell Rivlin.

== Works ==
- An Evolutionary Theory of Economic Change, 1982, ISBN 0-674-27228-5
- Patents and Welfare in an Evolutionary Model., 1993
- Founding Co-editor of Journal of Economic Behavior and Organization (with R. H. Day)
