= Evolutionary economics =

Subject inspired by evolutionary biology

Evolutionary economics is a school of economic thought that is inspired by evolutionary biology. Although not defined by a strict set of principles and uniting various approaches, it treats economic development as a process rather than an equilibrium and emphasizes change (qualitative, organisational, and structural), innovation, complex interdependencies, self-evolving systems, and limited rationality as the drivers of economic evolution. The support for the evolutionary approach to economics in recent decades seems to have initially emerged as a criticism of the mainstream neoclassical economics, but by the beginning of the 21st century it had become part of the economic mainstream itself.

Evolutionary economics does not take the characteristics of either the objects of choice or of the decision-maker as fixed. Rather, it focuses on the non-equilibrium processes that transform the economy from within and their implications, considering interdependencies and feedback. The processes in turn emerge from the actions of diverse agents with bounded rationality who may learn from experience and interactions and whose differences contribute to the change.

== Roots ==
=== Early ideas ===
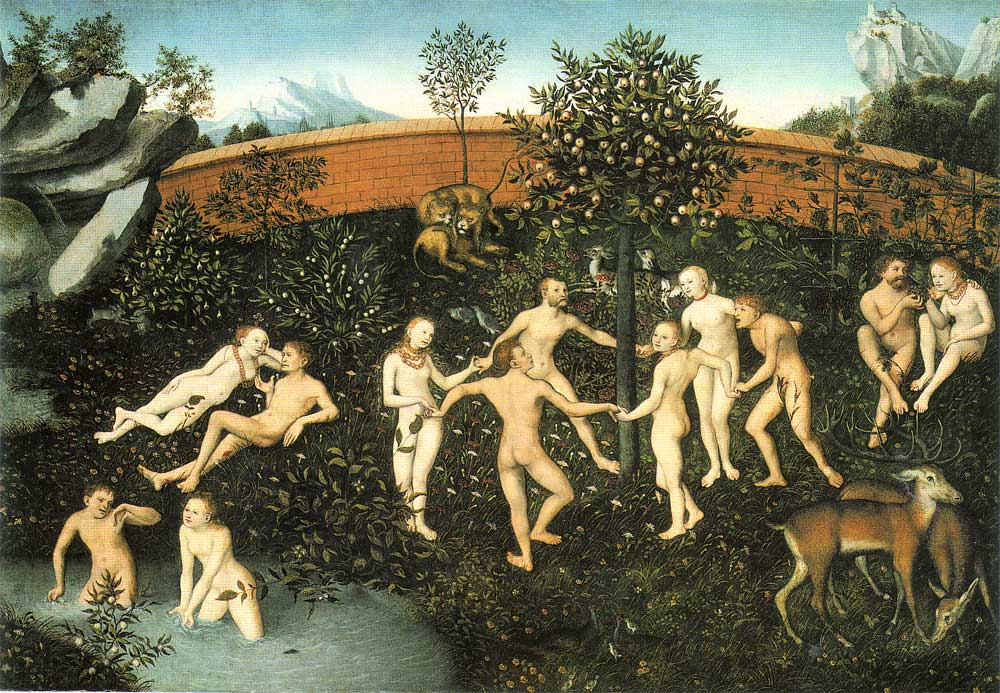
From peace and harmony... (Lucas Cranach the Elder, The Golden Age, 1530)

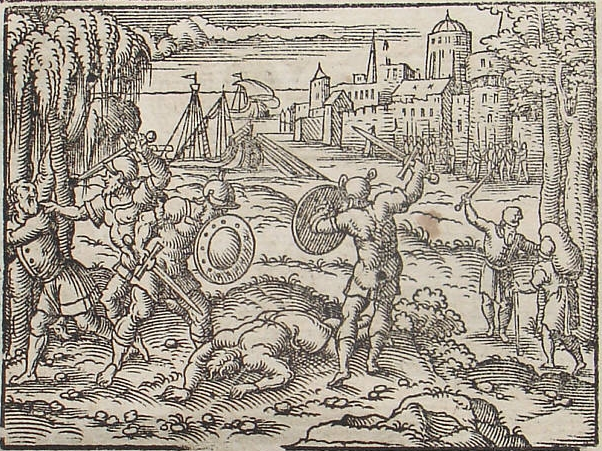
... to war and sorrow (Virgil Solis, The Iron Age, 1581)

The idea of human society and the world in general as subject to evolution has been following mankind throughout its existence. Hesiod, an ancient Greek poet thought to be the first Western written poet regarding himself as an individual, described five Ages of Man—the Golden Age, the Silver Age, the Bronze Age, the Heroic Age, and the Iron Age—following from divine existence to toil and misery. Modern scholars consider his works as one of the sources for early economic thought. The concept is also present in the Metamorphoses by Ovid, an ancient Roman poet. His Four Ages include technological progress: in the Golden Age, men did not know arts and craft, whereas by the Iron Age people had learnt and discovered agriculture, architecture, mining, navigation, and national boundaries, but had also become violent and greedy. This concept was not exclusive to the Greek and Roman civilizations (see, for instance, Yuga Cycles in Hinduism, the Three Ages of Buddhism, Aztecs' Five Suns), but a common feature is the path towards misery and destruction, with technological advancements accompanied by moral degradation.

=== Medieval and early modern times ===
Medieval views on society, economics and politics (at least in Europe and Pax Islamica) were influenced by religious norms and traditions. Catholic and Islamic scholars debated on the moral appropriateness of certain economic practices, such as interest. The subject of changes was thought of in existential terms. For instance, Augustine of Hippo regarded time as a phenomenon of the universe created by God and a measure of change, whereas God exists outside of time.

A major contribution to the views on the evolution of society was Leviathan by Thomas Hobbes. A human, according to Hobbes, is a matter in motion with one's own appetites and desires. Due to these numerous desires and the scarcity of resources, the natural state of a human is a war of all against all:

"In such condition, there is no place for Industry; because the fruit thereof is uncertain; and consequently no Culture of the Earth; no Navigation, nor use of the commodities that may be imported by Sea; no commodious Building; no Instruments of moving, and removing such things as require much force; no Knowledge of the face of the Earth; no account of Time; no Arts; no Letters; no Society; and which is worst of all, continual feare, and danger of violent death; And the life of man, solitary, poore, nasty, brutish, and short."

In order to overcome this natural anarchy, Hobbs saw it necessary to impose an ultimate restraint in the form of a sovereign.

=== Economic development, natural state, and social evolution ===
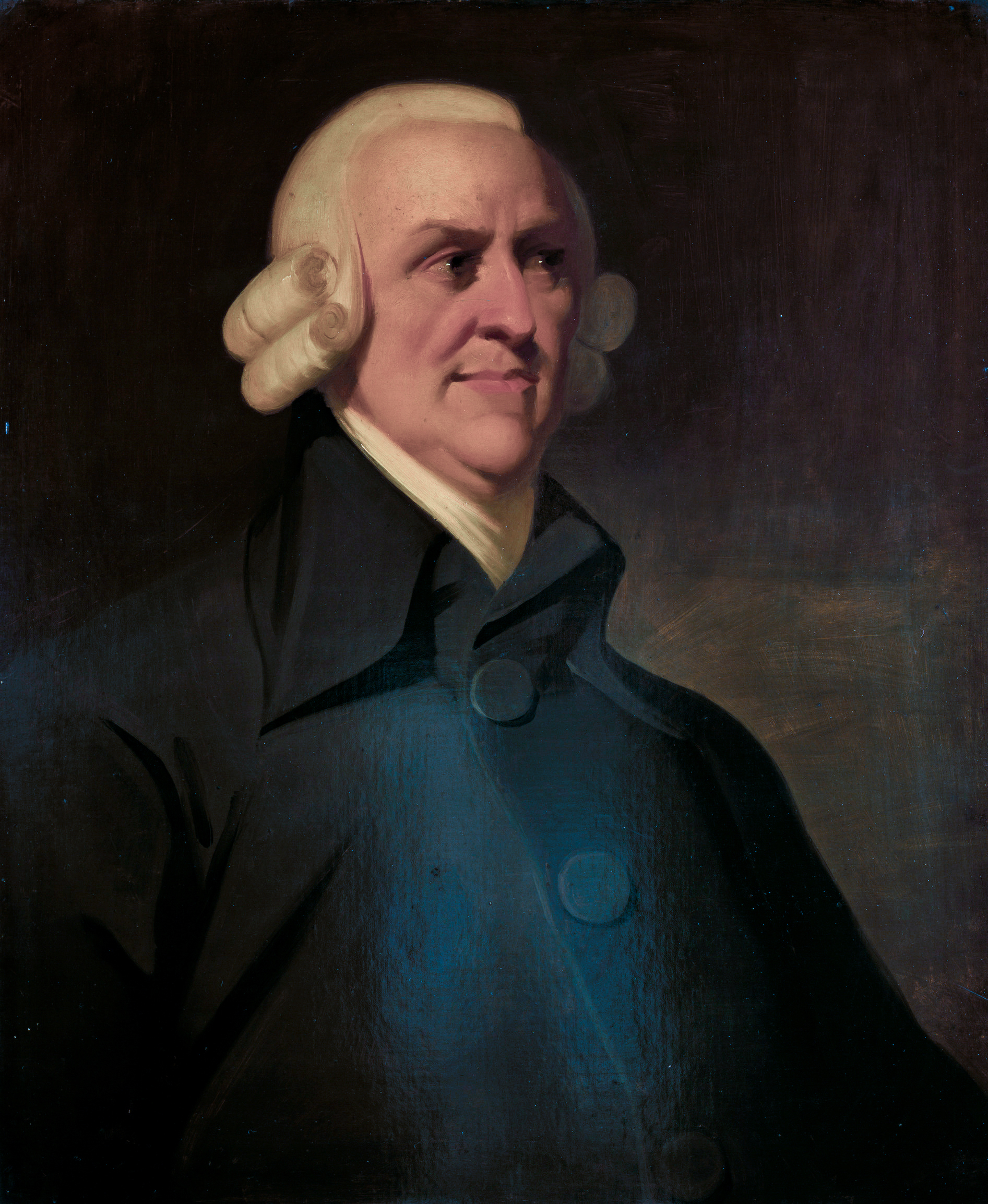
Adam Smith (1723–1790)

A landmark work in many senses, The Wealth of Nations by Adam Smith was also one to offer a description of economic development throughout the history of mankind—as well as insights into the nature of this development. In Book III (Of the different Progress of Opulence in different Nations), Smith constantly underlines the importance of the natural order of things, which economic improvements follow, and shows the feedback chain that allows economies to progress further, based on what has been achieved. This falls in line with the notion of natural rights shared by other Age of Enlightenment thinkers, such as John Locke and Montesquieu.

A somewhat different view relates to the names of prominent socialists of the 19th century, who viewed economic and political systems as products of social evolution (in contrast to the notions of natural rights and morality). In his book What is Property?, Pierre-Joseph Proudhon noted:

Thus, in a given society, the authority of man over man is inversely proportional to the stage of intellectual development which that society has reached.

The approach was also employed by Karl Marx. In his view, over the course of history superior economic systems would replace inferior ones. Inferior systems were beset by internal contradictions and inefficiencies that made them impossible to survive in the long term. In Marx's scheme, feudalism was replaced by capitalism, which would eventually be superseded by socialism.

== Emergence as a separate field of study ==
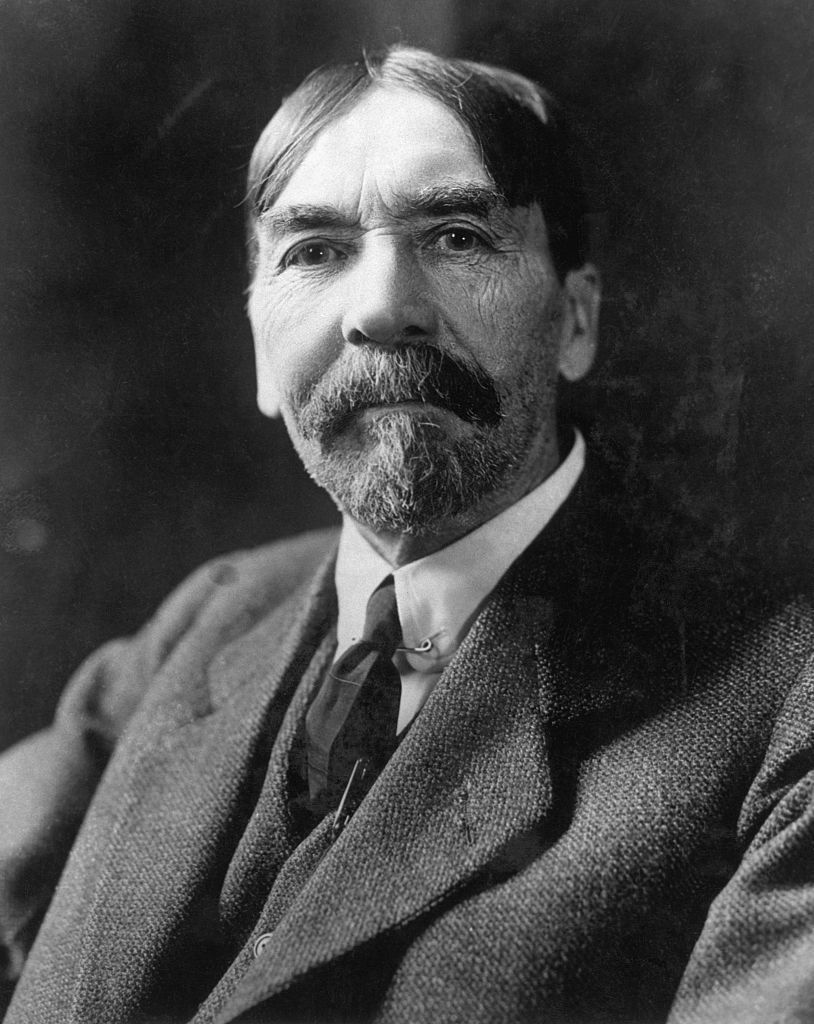
Thorstein Veblen (1857–1929) is considered by many as the "father" of evolutionary economics.

The term "evolutionary economics" might have been coined by Thorstein Veblen. Veblen saw the need for taking into account cultural variation in his economic approach; no universal "human nature" could possibly be invoked to explain the variety of norms and behaviours that the new science of anthropology showed to be the rule rather than an exception. He also argued that social institutions are subject to selection process and that economic science should embrace the Darwinian theory.

Veblen's followers quickly abandoned his evolutionary legacy. When they finally returned to the use of the term "evolutionary", they referred to development and change in general, without its Darwinian meaning. Further researchers, such as Joseph Schumpeter, studied entrepreneurship and innovation using this term, but not in the Darwinian sense. Another prominent economist, Friedrich von Hayek, also employed the elements of the evolutionary approach, especially criticizing "the fatal conceit" of socialists who believed they could and should design a new society while disregarding human nature. However, Hayek seemed to see the Darwin theory not as a revolution itself, but rather as an intermediary step in the line of evolutionary thinking. There were other notable contributors to the evolutionary approach in economics, such as Armen Alchian, who argued that, faced with uncertainty and incomplete information, firms adapt to the environment instead of pursuing profit maximization.

=== An Evolutionary Theory of Economic Change and beyond ===
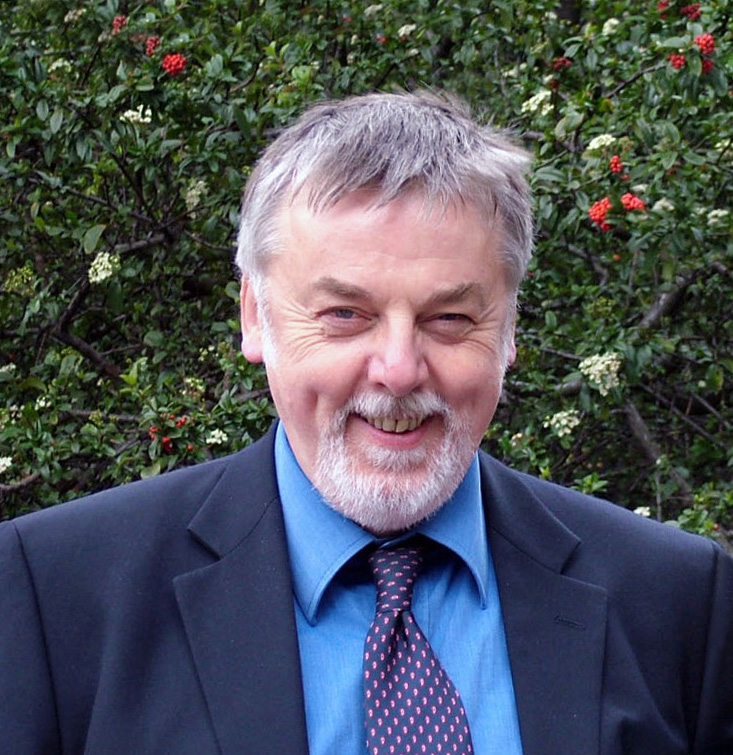
Geoffrey Hodgson, recognised as one of the leading figures of modern critical institutionalism, Emeritus Professor in Management, Loughborough University

The publication of An Evolutionary Theory of Economic Change by Richard R. Nelson and Sidney G. Winter in 1982 marked a turning point in the field of evolutionary economics. Inspired by Alchian's work about the decision-making process of firms under uncertainty and the behavioural theory of the firm by Richard Cyert and James March, Nelson and Winter constructed a comprehensive evolutionary theory of business behavior using the concept of natural selection. In this framework, firms operate on the basis of organizational routines, which they evaluate and may change while functioning in a certain selection environment. Since then, evolutionary economics, as noted by Nicolai Foss, has been concerned with "the transformation of already existing structures and the emergence and possible spread of novelties." Economies have been viewed as a complex system, a result of causal interactions (non-linear and chaotic) between different agents and entities with varied characteristics. Instead of perfect information and rationality, Herbert Simon's concept of bounded rationality has become prevailing.

By the 1990s, as put by Geoffrey Hodgson,

it was possible to write of an international network or 'invisible college' of 'evolutionary economists' who, despite their analytical differences, were focusing on the problem of analyzing structural, technological, cultural and institutional change in economic systems... They were also united by their common dislike of the static and equilibrium approaches that dominated mainstream economics.

== Recent developments ==
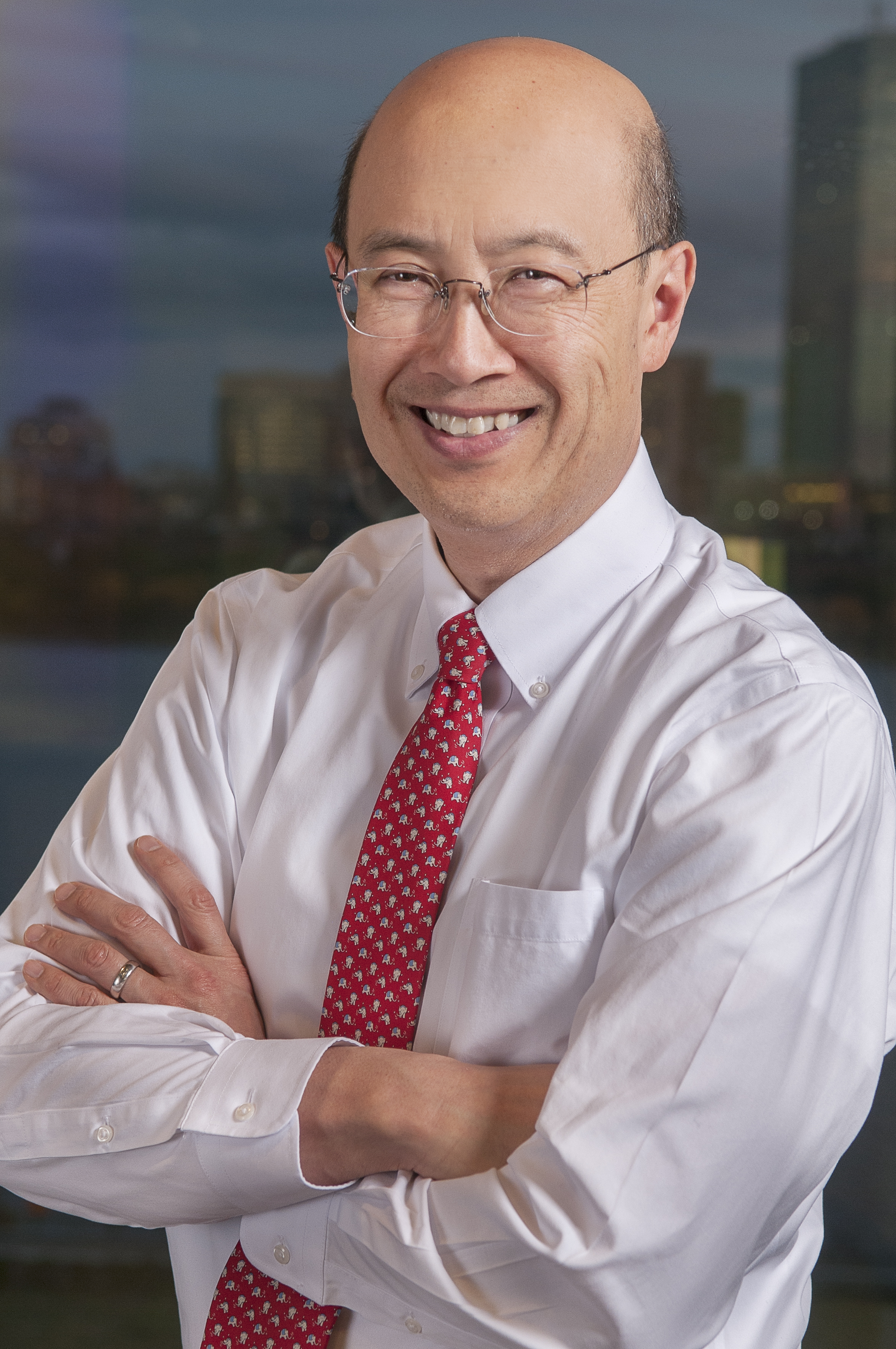
Andrew W. Lo, a Hong Kong-born Taiwanese-American economist and academic, MIT Sloan professor

The role of evolutionary forces in the process of economic development over the course of human history has been further explored during the past decades. For example, Paul Rubin extensively described how apparent anomalies in decision-making, such as violations of the maximization principle, a zero-sum way of thinking, or a dislike of competition and free trade, may be a result of the human brain evolution. Another concept Rubin and his colleagues viewed through the lenses of evolutionary analysis is the utility function, which may essentially be represented as the fitness evolutionary function.

Elements of evolutionary approach have also appeared in financial economics. Around 2004, Andrew Lo proposed the adaptive market hypothesis—an extension of the efficient market hypothesis that treats financial market agents as "species" who exist in some environment (e.g., the number of competitors, profit opportunities) and behave accordingly. This hypothesis does not deny that efficient financial market equilibria may exist, but it necessarily suggests that other states may emerge and evolve due to adaption and natural selection. Although quite recent, Lo's hypothesis has already been empirically tested with regard to a number of cases, such as the analysis of influence of religious holidays and political regimes on financial markets in Islamic countries or the evolution of Bitcoin market.

=== Unified growth theory ===
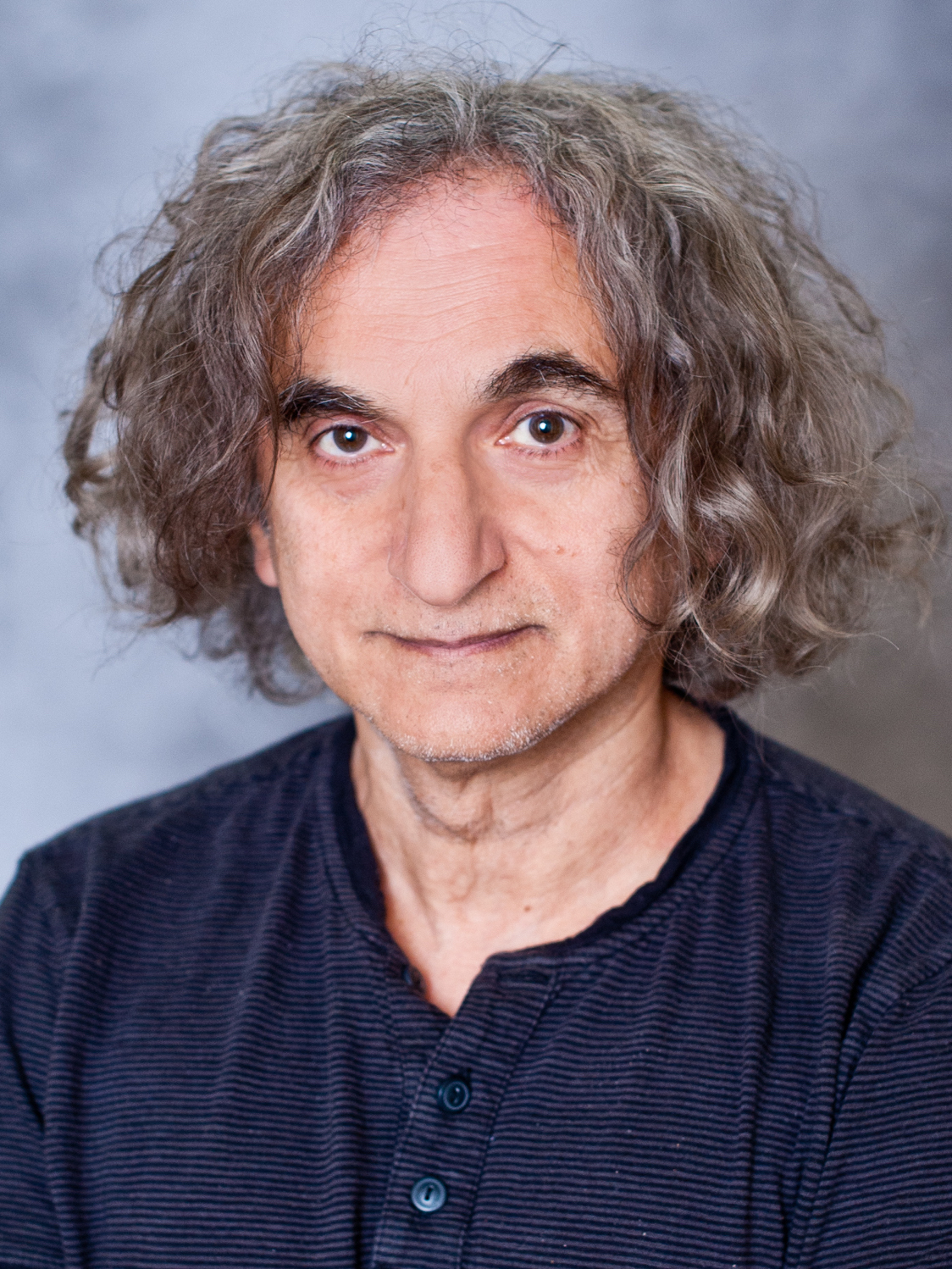
Known for his unified growth theory, Oded Galor employs principles that may belong to evolutionary economics.

A considerable contribution to the understanding of economies as constantly evolving systems was provided by Oded Galor and his colleagues. A pioneer of the unified growth theory, Galor depicts economic growth and development throughout human history as a continuous process driven by technological progress and the accumulation of human capital as well as by the accumulation of those biological, social and cultural features that favour further development.

According to Galor's model, technological advancements in the early eras of the mankind (during the Malthusian epoch, with limited resources and near-subsistence levels of income) would lead to increases in the size of population, which in turn would further accelerate technological progress due to the production of new ideas and the increase in demand for them. At some point technological advancements would require higher levels of education and generate the demand for educated labour force. After that, an economy would move into a new phase characterised by demographic transition (given that investment into less children, although more costly, would yield higher returns) and sustained economic growth. The process is accompanied by improvements in living standards, the position of the working class as necessary in order to complement technological progress (contrary to Marx and his followers, who predicted its further impoverishment), and the position of women, paving the way for further social and gender equality improvements. Interdependent, these elements facilitate each other, creating a unified process of growth and development, although the pace may be different for different societies.

In The Journey of Humanity: The Origins of Wealth and Inequality (2022) Galor provides some statements that further solidify his evolutionary approach:

Consider ... two large clans: the Quanty and the Qualy ... Suppose that Quanty households bear on average four children each, of whom only two reach adulthood and find a reproductive partner. Meanwhile, Qualy households bear on average only two children each, because their budget does not allow them to invest in the education and health of additional offspring, and yet, thanks to the investment that they do make, both children not only reach adulthood and find a reproductive partner but they also find jobs in commercial and skill-intensive occupations ... Now suppose the society in which they live is one where technological development boosts the demand for the services of blacksmiths, carpenters and other trades who can manufacture tools and more efficient machines. This increase in earning capacity would place the Qualy clan at a distinct evolutionary advantage. Within a generation or two, its families are likely to enjoy higher incomes and amass greater resources.

== Criticism ==
The emergence of modern evolutionary economics was welcomed by the critics of the neoclassical mainstream. However, the field, especially the approach by Nelson and Winter, has also drawn critical attitude from other heterodox economists. A year after An Evolutionary Theory of Economic Change was published, Philip Mirowski expressed his doubts that this framework represented genuine evolutionary economics research (i.e., in the vein of Veblen) and not just a variant of neoclassical methodology, especially since the authors admitted their framework could include neoclassical orthodoxy. Some Veblenian institutionalists claim this framework is only a "protective modification of the neoclassical economics and is antithetical to Veblen's evolutionary economics." Another possible shortcoming (recognized by the proponents of modern evolutionary economics) is that the field is heterogenous, with no convergence on an integrated approach.

== Related fields ==
=== Evolutionary psychology ===
Evolutionary psychology is a theoretical approach in psychology that examines cognition and behaviour from a modern evolutionary perspective. It seeks to identify human psychological adaptations with regards to the ancestral problems they evolved to solve. In this framework, psychological traits and mechanisms are either functional products of natural and sexual selection or non-adaptive by-products of other adaptive traits. Economic concepts can also be viewed through these lenses, as demonstrated by Paul Rubin, among others.

=== Evolutionary game theory ===
Evolutionary game theory is the application of game theory to evolving populations in biology. It defines a framework of contests, strategies, and analytics into which Darwinian competition can be modelled. It originated in 1973 with John Maynard Smith and George R. Price's formalisation of contests, analysed as strategies, and the mathematical criteria that can be used to predict the results of competing strategies.

Evolutionary game theory has helped to explain the basis of altruistic behaviours in Darwinian evolution. It has in turn become of interest to sociologists, anthropologists, philosophers, and economists.

== See also ==
- Adaptive market hypothesis
- Behavioural economics
- Complexity economics
- Cultural economics
- Heterodox economics
- Institutional economics
- Mainstream economics
- Neoclassical economics
- Non-equilibrium economics
- Ecological model of competition
- Population dynamics
- Creative destruction
- Innovation system
- Evolutionary psychology
- Evolutionary socialism
- Universal Darwinism
- Association for Evolutionary Economics
- European Association for Evolutionary Political Economy
- Andrew W. Lo
- Geoffrey Hodgson
- Oded Galor
- Paul H. Rubin
- Richard R. Nelson
- Sidney G. Winter
- Thorstein Veblen
