= Technological Revolutions and Financial Capital =

Economics of Innovation

- Cover of the first edition (hardcover)
- Author: Carlota Perez
- Language: English, Spanish 2004, Korean 2006, Chinese 2007, Russian 2010
- Genre: Non-fiction
- Publisher: Edward Elgar Publishing
- Publication date: April 2003
- Publication place: United States
- Media type: Print (Paperback) & ebook
- Pages: 224 pp
- ISBN: 1843763311

Technological Revolutions and Financial Capital: The Dynamics of Bubbles and Golden Ages is an academic book by Carlota Perez that seeks to describe the connection between technological development and financial bubbles as seen in the emergence of long term technology trends. The model described by Carlota Perez shows repeated surges of technological development over the past three centuries with examples such as: the age of steam and railways, the age of steel and electricity, mass production and the automobile and the current information/knowledge society.

== Five Technological Revolutions ==
The book identifies five bursts of technological innovation that have occurred in industrial history.

Technological revolution	New technologies and industries	New infrastructures	Country and year of onset
1. The industrial revolution	Mechanised cotton industry, wrought iron, machinery	Canals and waterways, water power, turnpike roads	Britain, 1771
2. Age of steam and railways	Steam engines and machinery, iron and coal mining, rolling stock production	Railways, ports, postal service, city gas	Britain 1829, spreading to Continent and USA
3. Age of steel, electricity and heavy engineering	Cheap steel, full development of steam engine, heavy chemistry, civil engineering, electrical equipment industry, canned and bottled food, paper and packaging	Worldwide shipping, transcontinental railways, worldwide telegraph, telephone, electrical networks	USA and Germany, 1875
4. Age of oil, automobiles, and mass production	Mass-produced automobiles, cheap oil and fuels, petrochemicals, internal combustion engine for automobiles, tractors, aeroplanes, war tanks, and electricity production, home electrical appliances, refrigerated and frozen foods	Worldwide analogue telecommunications	USA, spreading to Europe, 1908
5. Age of information and telecommunications	The information revolution, cheap microelectronics, computers, software, telecommunications, control instruments, computer-aided biotechnology, new materials	Worldwide digital telecommunications, the Internet, electronic mail and other e-services, multiple source electricity networks, high-speed multi-modal physical transport links by land, air and water	USA, spreading to Europe and Asia, 1971

== Technological Revolutions ==
Perez defines Technological Revolutions as the emergence of a cluster of interrelated technologies as well as respective products and industries. These technological innovations are different from the current technological landscape, they are dynamic and have a long-lasting and profound effect on the working of the economy. Their aggregated deployment typically leads to a long-term surge of economic development and improvements in living standards. Their launch and acceleration is usually driven by an all-pervasive low-cost input, for instance, an important material, source of energy or technical component. Perez clearly distinguishes the term Technological Revolution from the term Revolutionary Technology, as the latter only describes a single innovative technology, but not its interrelation with other emerging innovations.

Perez derives the revolutionary nature of these technologies from their ability to shape behaviour beyond their industries of origin and reach widespread diffusion. These new general purpose technologies and their associated organizational principles influence and spread into most areas of economic activity. Their deployment enables an increase in efficiency and modernization across all sectors. The amalgamation of new dynamic industries, propelled by new cheap inputs, products and processes, forms a new engine of growth for the whole economy, according to Perez.

== Techno-Economic Paradigms ==
In the book, a Techno-Economic Paradigm refers to the gradually resulting best-practice framework characterized by the attributes of the Technological Revolution and corresponding organizational set-ups. These principles embody the most efficient methods for conducting business in the context of the particular technological innovations and leveraging them to modernize the broader economy. Once widely adopted, these principles form the foundational "common sense" for organizing activities and structuring institutions across diverse sectors. The emergence of a cluster of new technologies not only rejuvenates the industries of the previous paradigm, but also leads to new industries, products and infrastructure. This new “common sense” guides investors, consumers, entrepreneurs and other economic actors.

According to Perez, a new Techno-Economic Paradigm is the result of a Technological Revolution and is divided into an installation and a deployment phase. Between the two phases is a period of upheaval, as institutions still operate according to the old paradigm and must first adapt to achieve social progress.

== Role of capital ==
The role and behaviour of capital, investments, and the adjacent institutional framework play a central role in Perez's model and are presented as the driving forces of the diffusion cycles. Perez adapts the dichotomy of production and financial capital, which are distinct from each other.

Production capital encompasses the industries, businesses, and infrastructure that adopt and implement new technologies, transforming them into tangible economic output, particularly during the deployment phase.

Financial capital plays a critical role during the installation phase, funding innovation and experimentation through investments. Perez argues that decoupled speculative activity during this phase results in financial bubbles, which ultimately burst. This financial activity, despite its initial disruptive nature, helps finance the infrastructure and systems required for the new technologies to mature.

Perez underscores the importance of a balanced relationship between these two forms of capital, with financial capital enabling early-stage innovation and production capital ensuring sustained, widespread economic and potential social progress in the later stages of a techno-economic paradigm.

== Financial cycles ==
Perez found that these cycles of technological revolutions are coupled with financial cycles. Each cycle, which may take 50–60 years, consists of the following four phases:

Irruption phase: There is an intense funding of innovation in new technologies. Clusters of new revolutionary inventions appear. New industries are established, and the construction of new infrastructure begins.

Frenzy phase: Increased speculation and financialization leads to a decoupling between financial capital and production capital. Capital is invested more in financial innovations than in technological innovations. Asset bubbles are inflated.

Synergy phase: Growing inequality and political unrest. A need for political regulation of the financial sector is acknowledged. Asset bubbles may burst. The link between financial capital and production capital is repaired.

Maturity phase: The market for the new technology begins to become saturated. Social structure and infrastructure have adapted to the new technologies. Opportunities for investment are decreasing. The idle financial capital is moving to new sectors and new regions where it may lay the foundation of the next great surge.

== Critical reviews ==
A Foreign Affairs review said "A broad-sweep 'think piece' in the Schumpeterian spirit, this book discusses the relationship between major technological innovations and financial booms and busts."

An Economist article summarizes her work, "In her book, “Technological Revolutions and Financial Capital”, Ms Perez traces five boom-and-bust cycles of technological innovation: the industrial revolution; steam and railways; steel, electricity and heavy engineering; oil, cars and mass production; and information technology and telecommunications.

Bertrand M. Roehner, reviewing the book for EH.Net, praised Perez's approach of examining technological revolutions across multiple historical periods rather than focusing on a single country or period. He highlighted the book's analysis of the relationship between technological change, investment capital and financial cycles, while noting that some of its conclusions could benefit from further quantitative research.

In 2009, Wolfgang Drechsler, Reiner Kattel and Erik S. Reinert honoured Carlota Perez with a volume of essays titled Techno Economic Paradigms. Essays in Honour of Carlota Perez. In the preface, they claim that they, “[...] see the economic world, as it is really unfolding, with other eyes because of her theory of Techno-Economic Paradigms [...]”.
