= Geoffrey Hodgson =

British economist

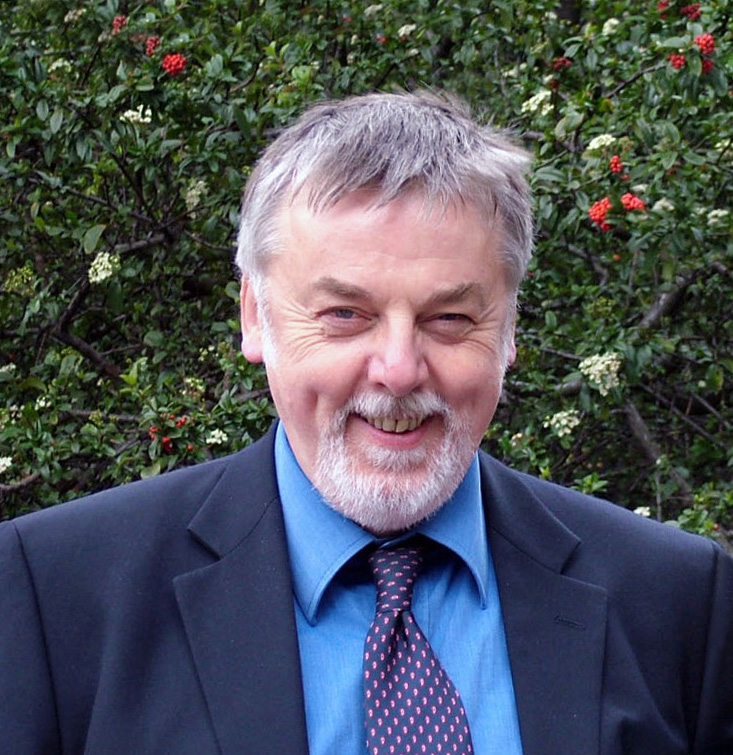
- Geoffrey Hodgson
- Born: 28 July 1946 (age 79)

Academic background
- Influences: Thorstein Veblen

Academic work
- Discipline: Institutional economics, History of economic thought
- School or tradition: Institutional economics
- Website: Information at IDEAS / RePEc

Geoffrey Martin Hodgson (born 28 July 1946, Watford) is Emeritus Professor in Management at the London campus of Loughborough University, and also an editor of the Journal of Institutional Economics.

Hodgson is recognised as one of the leading figures of modern critical institutionalism which carries forth the critical spirit and intellectual tradition of the founders of institutional economics, particularly that of Thorstein Veblen. His broad research interests span from evolutionary economics and history of economic thought to Marxism and theoretical biology. He first became known for his book Economics and Institutions: A Manifesto for a Modern Institutional Economics (1988), which criticises modern 'mainstream' economics and calls to revise economic theory on the new grounds of institutionalism. His reputation has become enhanced owing to the trilogy of more recent books – Economics and Utopia (1999), How Economics Forgot History (2001) and The Evolution of Institutional Economics (2004) all of which built Hodgson's arguments into a more rounded and powerful critique of mainstream economic theory.

In 1988, Hodgson was involved in setting up the European Association for Evolutionary Political Economy (EAEPE). He was its general secretary until 1998. In 2000 Hodgson co-founded The Other Canon, a center and network for heterodox economics research, with main founder and executive chairman Erik Reinert and others. In 2013, Hodgson co-founded the World Interdisciplinary Network for Institutional Research (WINIR). In his 2015 book "Conceptualizing Capitalism" and an article entitled "Legal Institutionalism", he sketched his own research program of a legal institutionalism.

== Institutions according to Hodgson ==
According to Hodgson, institutions are the stuff of social life. He defines them in a 2006 article by saying that institutions are "the systems of established and prevalent social rules that structure social interaction". Examples of institutions may be language, money, law, systems of weights and measures, table manners and organisations (for example firms). Conventions, that may be included in law, can be regarded to be institutions as well (Hodgson, 2006, p. 2).

What Hodgson considers important about institutions is the way that they structure social life and frame our perceptions and preferences. They also create stable expectations. He argues that: "Generally, institutions enable ordered thought, expectation, and action by imposing form and consistency on human activities". Consequently, institutions enable as well as constrain action.

Hodgson regards institutions as systems of rules. Broadly understood a rule is "a socially transmitted and customary normative injunction or immanently normative disposition, that in circumstances X do Y" (Hodgson, 2006, p. 3). This means that to be effective a rule has to be embedded in dispositions or habits. Mere decrees are not necessarily rules in this sense. Habits and customs help to give a normative status to a legal rule that can help a new law to become effective. In the process of social interaction norms are constantly changed (Hodgson, 2006, pp. 3–4)

== Political Activity ==
As described in his autobiography From Marx to Markets, Hodgson was active in left politics from 1965 to about 1985. In 1979, Hodgson stood for the Labour Party in Manchester Withington.

General election 1979: Manchester Withington
Party	Candidate	Votes	%	±%
Conservative	Fred Silvester	18,862	47.3	+4.3
Labour	Geoffrey Hodgson	15,510	38.9	+1.1
Liberal	John T. Mitchell	5,387	13.5	−5.7
Independent	Michael George Gibson	157	0.4	New
Majority		3,352	8.4	+3.3
Turnout		39,916	74.7	+6.9
Conservative hold		Swing	+1.6	

== Books ==
- From Marx to Markets: An Intellectual Odyssey (Edward Elgar Publishing, 2025) ISBN 9781035350094
- The Wealth of a Nation: Institutional Foundations of English Capitalism (Princeton University Press, 2023) ISBN 9780691247014
- Liberal Solidarity: The Political Economy of Social Democratic Liberalism (Edward Elgar Publishing, 2021) ISBN 9781800882188
- Is Socialism Feasible? Towards an Alternative Future (Edward Elgar Publishing, 2019). ISBN 1789901634
- Is There a Future for Heterodox Economics? Institutions, Ideology and a Scientific Community (Edward Elgar Publishing, 2019). ISBN 178990160X
- Evolutionary Economics: Its Nature and Future (Cambridge University Press, 2019). ISBN 1108738001
- Wrong Turnings: How the Left Got Lost (University of Chicago Press, 2018). ISBN 9780226505886
- Conceptualizing Capitalism: Institutions, Evolution, Future (University of Chicago Press, 2015) ISBN 9780226168005
- From Pleasure Machines to Moral Communities: An Evolutionary Economics without Homo Economicus (University of Chicago Press, 2013) ISBN 9780226922713
- (Edited with Charles Camic) Essential Writings of Thorstein Veblen (Routledge, London and New York, 2011). ISBN 978-0-415-77790-2
- (With Thorbjoern Knudsen) Darwin's Conjecture: The Search for General Principles of Social and Economic Evolution (University of Chicago Press, 2010). ISBN 978-0-226-34690-8.
- Economics in the Shadows of Darwin and Marx (Edward Elgar, Cheltenham, 2006). ISBN 978-1-84542-497-8. ISBN 1-84542-497-2.
- The Evolution of Institutional Economics: Agency, Structure and Darwinism in American Institutionalism (Routledge, London, 2004). ISBN 0-415-32253-7
- A Modern Reader in Evolutionary and Institutional Economics (Edward Elgar Publishing, Cheltenham and Northampton, 2002) ISBN 1-84064-474-5
- How Economics Forgot History: The Problem of Historical Specificity in Social Science (Routledge, London, 2001). ISBN 0-415-25717-4. Also in a Chinese edition.
- Evolution and Institutions: On Evolutionary Economics and the Evolution of Economics (Edward Elgar Publishing, Cheltenham and Northampton, 1999) ISBN 1-85898-813-6
- Economics and Utopia: Why the Learning Economy is Not the End of History (Routledge, London, 1999) ISBN 0-415-19685-X
- Economics and Evolution: Bringing Life Back Into Economics (University of Michigan Press and Polity Press, 1993). ISBN 0-472-10522-1
- Economics and Institutions: A Manifesto for a Modern Institutional Economics (Polity Press, Cambridge, and University of Pennsylvania Press, Philadelphia, 1988). ISBN 0-7456-0277-0
- After Marx and Sraffa: Essays in Political Economy (Macmillan Press, London, 1991). ISBN 0-333-54224-X
- The Democratic Economy: A New Look at Planning, Markets and Power (Penguin, Harmondsworth, 1984). ISBN 0-14-022495-5 ISBN 978-0-14-022495-5
- Capitalism, Value and Exploitation (Martin Robertson, Oxford, 1982). ISBN 0-85520-414-1
- Labour at the Crossroads (Martin Robertson, Oxford, 1981). ISBN 0-85520-462-1
- Socialism and Parliamentary Democracy (Spokesman, Nottingham, 1977. Also in Italian, Spanish, Turkish and Japanese editions) ISBN 0-85124-207-3
- Trotsky and Fatalistic Marxism (Spokesman, Nottingham. 1975). ISBN 0 85124 136 0.
