= Christian Wolff (philosopher) =

German philosopher (1679–1754)

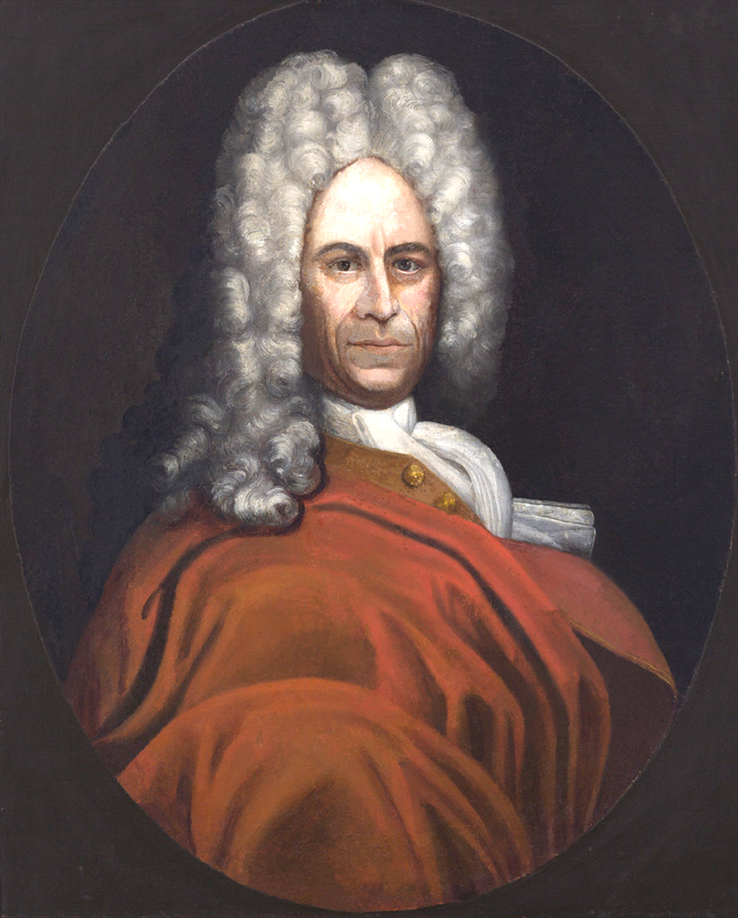
- Born: 24 January 1679; Breslau, Habsburg Silesia, Bohemian Crown, Holy Roman Empire (now Wrocław, Poland)
- Died: 9 April 1754 (aged 75); Halle an der Saale, Duchy of Magdeburg, Kingdom of Prussia, Holy Roman Empire
- Other name: Christian von Wolff (from 1745)

Education
- Education: University of Jena (M.A., 1702); Leipzig University (Dr. phil. habil., 1703)
- Thesis: On Universal Practical Philosophy, Composed from the Mathematical Method (1703)
- Doctoral advisor: Otto Mencke
- Other advisors: Gottfried Leibniz (epistolary correspondent); Ehrenfried Walther von Tschirnhaus

Philosophical work
- Era: 18th-century philosophy
- Region: Western philosophy
- School: Age of Enlightenment; Rationalism
- Institutions: Leipzig University; University of Halle; University of Marburg
- Notable students: Georg Bernhard Bilfinger; Mikhail Lomonosov; Konrad Gottlieb Marquardt; Johann Peter Reusch; Franz Albert Schultz
- Main interests: Philosophical logic, metaphysics, natural philosophy, ethics, philosophy of law
- Notable ideas: Theoretical philosophy in its twofold articulation: general metaphysics (also philosophia prima or ontology) and special metaphysics (rational psychology, rational cosmology, and rational theology); Coining the philosophical term "idealism"

Christian Wolff (/vɔːlf/; German: [vɔlf]; less correctly Wolf; also known as Wolfius; ennobled as Christian von Wolff in 1745; 24 January 1679 – 9 April 1754) was a German philosopher. Wolff is characterized as one of the most eminent German philosophers between Leibniz and Kant. His life work spanned almost every scholarly subject of his time, displayed and unfolded according to his demonstrative-deductive, mathematical method, which some deem the peak of Enlightenment rationality in Germany.

Wolff wrote in German as his primary language of scholarly instruction and research, although he did translate his works into Latin for his transnational European audience. A founding father of, among other fields, economics and public administration as academic disciplines, he concentrated especially in these fields, giving advice on practical matters to people in government, and stressing the professional nature of university education.

== Life ==
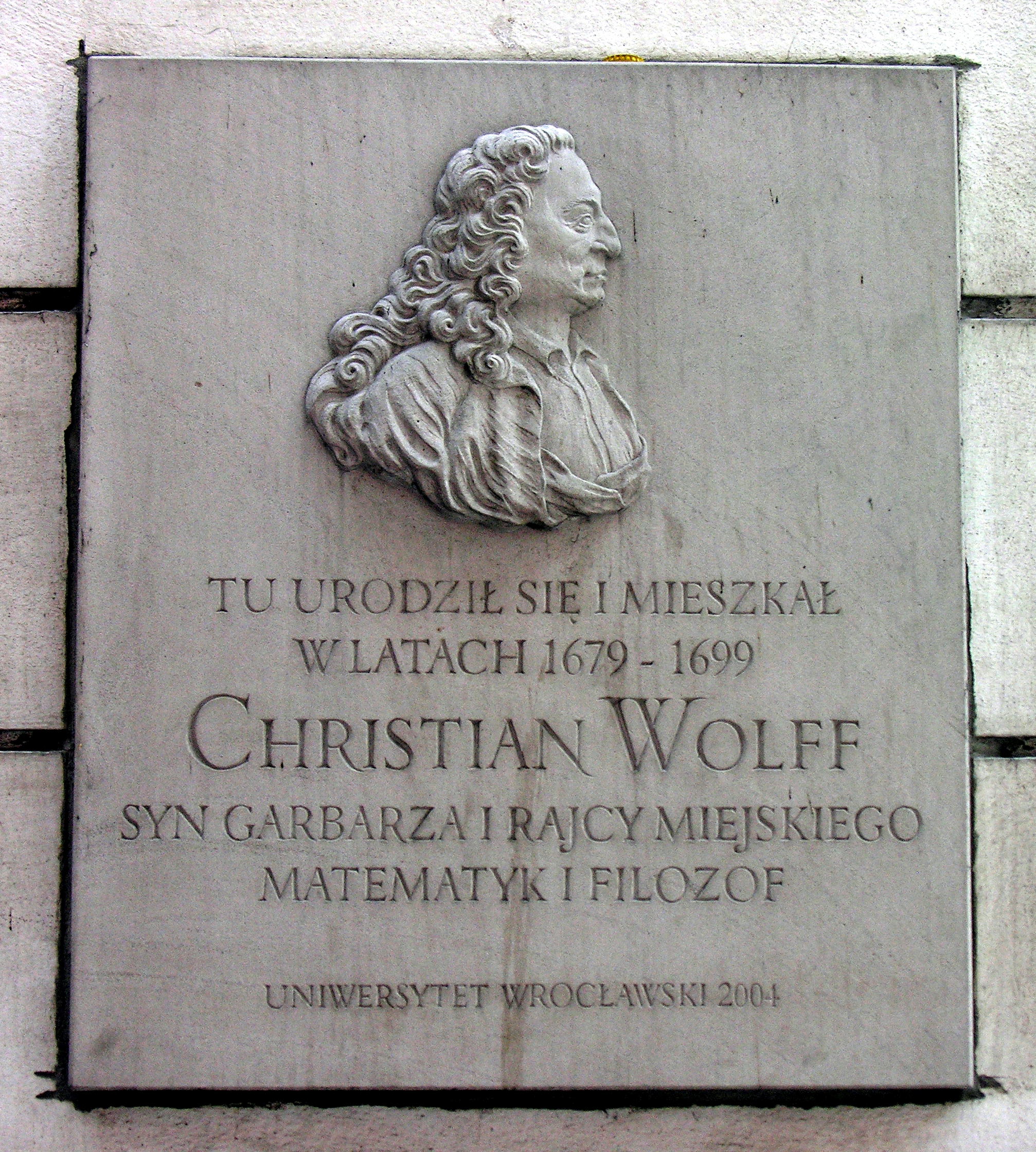
Plaque on building in Wrocław (German: Breslau) where Wolff was born and lived, 1679–99

Wolff was born in Breslau, Silesia (now Wrocław, Poland), into a modest family. He studied mathematics and physics at the University of Jena, soon adding philosophy.

In 1703, he qualified as Privatdozent at Leipzig University, (Note: His 1703 habilitation thesis title was Philosophia practica universalis, methodo mathematica conscripta (On Universal Practical Philosophy, Composed from the Mathematical Method).) where he lectured until 1706, when he was called as professor of mathematics and natural philosophy to the University of Halle. By this time he had made the acquaintance of Gottfried Leibniz (the two men met three times in their lifetime and they also engaged in epistolary correspondence), of whose philosophy his own system is a modified version.

At Halle, Wolff at first restricted himself to mathematics, but on the departure of a colleague, he added physics, and soon included all the main philosophical disciplines.

However, the claims Wolff advanced on behalf of philosophical reason appeared impious to his theological colleagues. Halle was the headquarters of Pietism, which, after a long struggle against Lutheran dogmatism, had assumed the characteristics of a new orthodoxy. Wolff's professed ideal was to base theological truths on mathematically certain evidence. Strife with the Pietists broke out openly in 1721, when Wolff, on the occasion of stepping down as pro-rector, delivered an oration "On the Practical Philosophy of the Chinese" (Eng. tr. 1750), in which he praised the purity of the moral precepts of Confucius, pointing to them as an evidence of the power of human reason to reach moral truth by its own efforts.

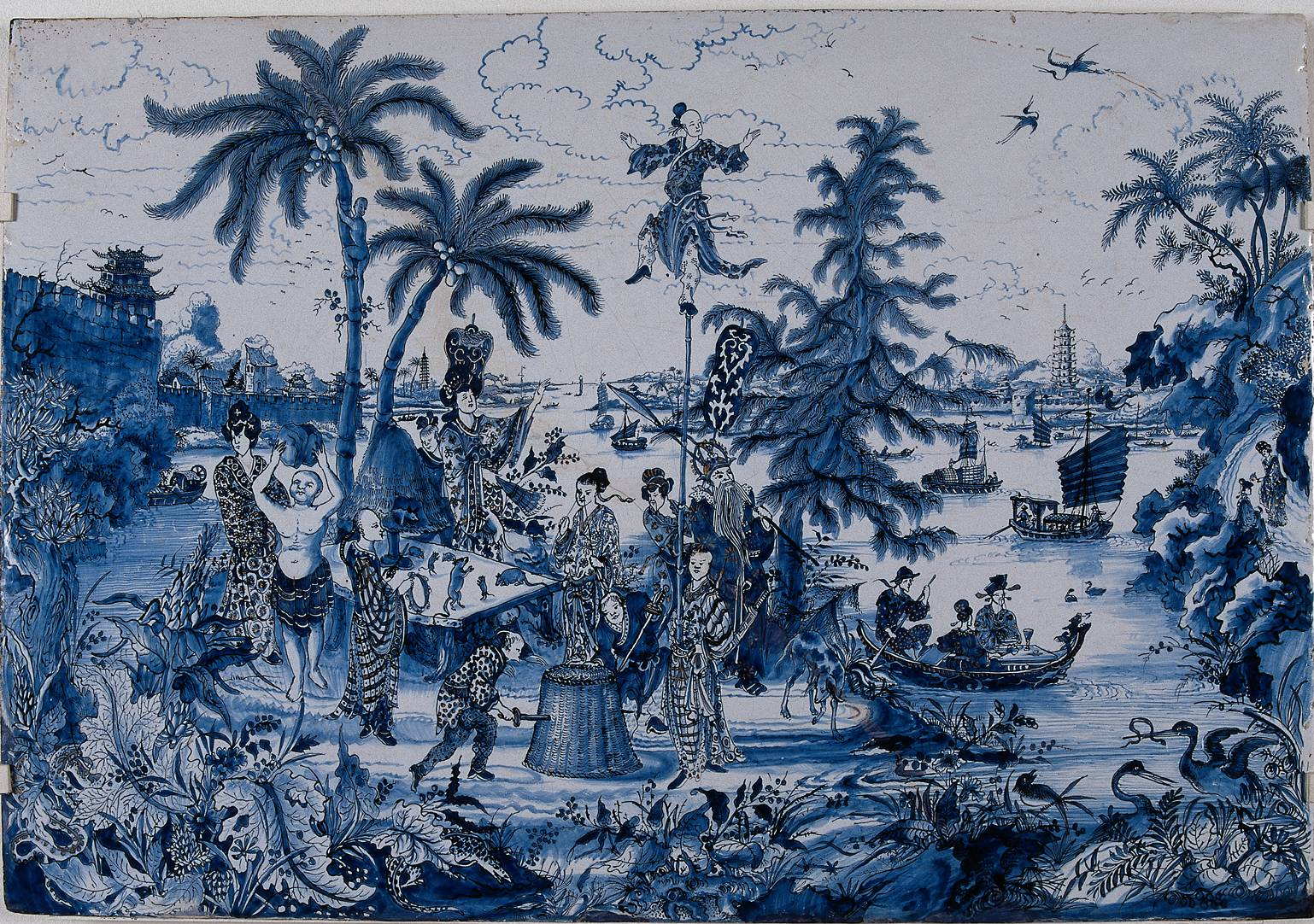
Delftware plaque with chinoiserie, 17th century

On 12 July 1723, Wolff held a lecture for students and the magistrates at the end of his term as a rector. Wolff compared, based on books by the Flemish missionaries François Noël (1651–1729) and Philippe Couplet (1623–1693), Moses, Christ, and Mohammed with Confucius.

According to Voltaire, August Hermann Francke had been teaching in an empty classroom but Wolff attracted with his lectures around 1,000 students from all over.

In the follow-up, Wolff was accused by Francke of fatalism and atheism, and ousted in 1723 from his first chair at Halle in one of the most celebrated academic dramas of the 18th century. His successors were Joachim Lange, a pietist, and his son, who had gained the ear of the king Frederick William I. (They claimed to the king if Wolff's determinism were recognized, no soldier who deserted could be punished as he would have acted only as it was necessarily predetermined that he should, which so enraged the king that he immediately deprived Wolff of his office, and ordered Wolff to leave Prussian territory within 48 hours or be hanged.)

The same day, Wolff passed into Saxony, and presently proceeded to Marburg, Hesse-Kassel, to whose university (the University of Marburg) he had received a call even before this crisis, which was now renewed. The Landgrave of Hesse received him with every mark of distinction, and the circumstances of his expulsion drew universal attention to his philosophy. It was everywhere discussed, and over two hundred books and pamphlets appeared for or against it before 1737, not reckoning the systematic treatises of Wolff and his followers.

According to Jonathan I. Israel, "the conflict became one of the most significant cultural confrontations of the 18th century and perhaps the most important of the Enlightenment in Central Europe and the Baltic countries before the French Revolution."

Prussian crown prince Frederick defended Wolff against Joachim Lange and ordered the Berlin minister Jean Des Champs, a former pupil of Wolff, to summarize Wolff's metaphysical work Vernünftige Gedanken von Gott, der Welt und der Seele des Menschen, auch allen Dingen überhaupt (1719/20) in French. Frederick proposed to send a copy of Logique ou réflexions sur les forces de l'entendement humain to Voltaire in his first letter to the philosopher from 8 August 1736. In 1737, Wolff's Vernünftige Gedanken von Gott was translated into French by Ulrich Friedrich von Suhm (1691–1740). Voltaire got the impression Frederick had translated the book himself.

In 1738, Frederick William began the hard labour of trying to read Wolff. In 1740, Frederick William died, and one of the first acts of his son and successor, Frederick the Great, was to acquire him for the Prussian Academy. Wolff refused, but accepted on 10 September 1740 an appointment in Halle.

His entry into the town on 6 December 1740 took on the character of a triumphal procession. In 1743, he became chancellor of the university, and in 1745, he received the title of Freiherr (Baron) from the Elector of Bavaria, possibly the first scholar to have been created hereditary Baron of the Holy Roman Empire on the basis of his academic work.

When Wolff died on 9 April 1754, he was a very wealthy man, owing almost entirely to his income from lecture-fees, salaries, and royalties. He was also a member of many academies. His school, the Wolffians, was the first school in the philosophical sense to be associated with a German philosopher. It dominated Germany until the rise of Kantianism.

Wolff was married and had several children.

== Philosophical work ==
Wolffian philosophy has a marked insistence everywhere on a clear and methodic exposition, holding confidence in the power of reason to reduce all subjects to this form. He was distinguished for writing copies in both Latin and German. Through his influence, natural law and philosophy were taught at most German universities, in particular those located in the Protestant principalities. Wolff personally expedited their introduction inside Hesse-Kassel.

The Wolffian system retains the determinism and optimism of Leibniz, but the monadology recedes into the background, the monads falling asunder into souls or conscious beings on the one hand and mere atoms on the other. The doctrine of the pre-established harmony also loses its metaphysical significance (while remaining an important heuristic device), and the principle of sufficient reason is once more discarded in favor of the principle of contradiction which Wolff seeks to make the fundamental principle of philosophy.

Wolff had philosophy divided into a theoretical and a practical part. Logic, sometimes called philosophia rationalis, forms the introduction or propaedeutics to both.

Theoretical philosophy had for its parts ontology or philosophia prima as a general metaphysics, which arises as a preliminary to the distinction of the three special metaphysics on the soul, world and God: rational psychology, rational cosmology, and rational theology. The three disciplines are called empirical and rational because they are independent of revelation. This scheme, which is the counterpart of religious tripartition in creature, creation, and Creator, is best known to philosophical students by Kant's treatment of it in the Critique of Pure Reason.

In the "Preface" of the 2nd edition of Kant's book, Wolff is defined as "the greatest of all dogmatic philosophers." Wolff was read by Søren Kierkegaard's father, Michael Pedersen. Kierkegaard himself was influenced by both Wolff and Kant to the point of resuming the tripartite structure and philosophical content to formulate his own three Stages on Life's Way.

Wolff saw ontology as a deductive science, knowable a priori and based on two fundamental principles: the principle of non-contradiction ("it cannot happen that the same thing is and is not") and the principle of sufficient reason ("nothing exists without a sufficient reason for why it exists rather than does not exist"). Beings are defined by their determinations or predicates, which can't involve a contradiction. Determinates come in 3 types: essentialia, attributes, and modes. Essentialia define the nature of a being and are therefore necessary properties of this being. Attributes are determinations that follow from essentialia and are equally necessary, in contrast to modes, which are merely contingent. Wolff conceives existence as just one determination among others, which a being may lack. Ontology is interested in being at large, not just in actual being. But all beings, whether actually existing or not, have a sufficient reason. The sufficient reason for things without actual existence consists in all the determinations that make up the essential nature of this thing. Wolff refers to this as a "reason of being" and contrasts it with a "reason of becoming", which explains why some things have actual existence.

Practical philosophy is subdivided into ethics, economics and politics. Wolff's moral principle is the realization of human perfection—seen realistically as the kind of perfection the human person actually can achieve in the world in which we live. It is perhaps the combination of Enlightenment optimism and worldly realism that made Wolff so successful and popular as a teacher of future statesmen and business leaders.

== Works ==
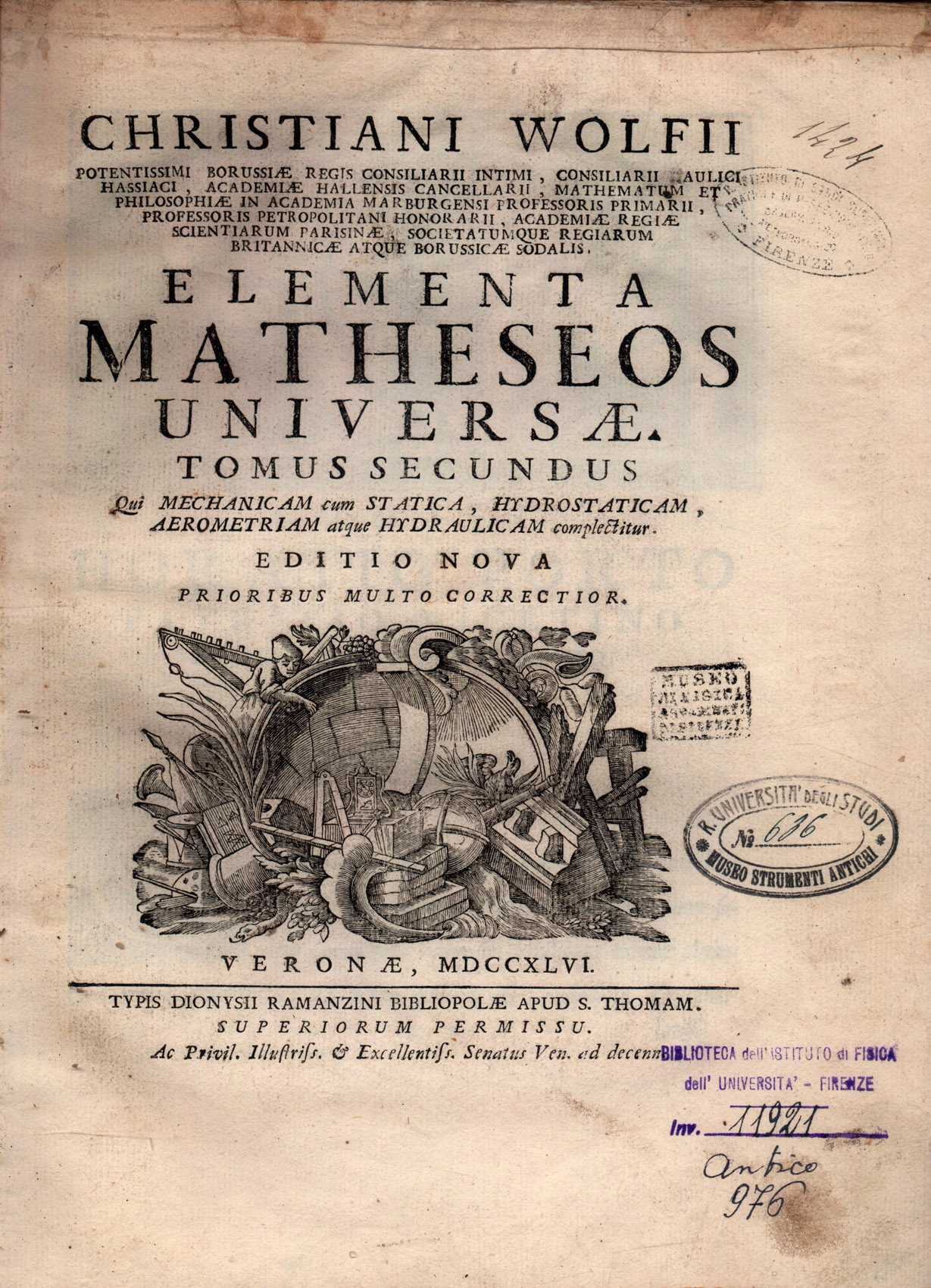
Elementa matheseos universae, 1746

Wolff's most important works are as follows:

- Dissertatio algebraica de algorithmo infinitesimali differentiali (Dissertation on the Algebra of Solving Differential Equations Using Infinitesimals; 1704).
- Anfangsgründe aller mathematischen Wissenschaften (1710); in Latin, Elementa matheseos universae (1713–1715).
- Vernünftige Gedanken von den Kräften des menschlichen Verstandes (1712). French translation by Jean Des Champs, Logique, Berlin: 1736. English translation by anonymous, Logic, London: 1770. Unfortunately, the English version is a translation of Des Champs's French edition instead of the original German of Wolff's Vernünftige Gedanken.
- Vern. Ged. von Gott, der Welt und der Seele des Menschen, auch allen Dingen überhaupt (1719, but with a publication date of 1720).
- Vern. Ged. von der Menschen Thun und Lassen (1720).
- Vern. Ged. von dem gesellschaftlichen Leben der Menschen (1721).
- Vern. Ged. von den Wirkungen der Natur (1723).
- Vern. Ged. von den Absichten der natürlichen Dinge (1724).
- Vern. Ged. von dem Gebrauche der Theile in Menschen, Thieren und Pflanzen (1725); the last seven may briefly be described as treatises on logic, metaphysics, moral philosophy, political philosophy, theoretical physics, teleology, physiology.
- Philosophia rationalis, sive logica (1728).
- Philosophia prima, sive Ontologia (1730). Part 1 translated as First Philosophy, or Ontology, a translation with critical introduction and annotation by Klaus Ottmann, Thompson: Spring Publications (2022).
- Cosmologia generalis (1731).
- Psychologia empirica (1732).
- Psychologia rationalis (1734).
- Theologia naturalis (1736–1737).
- Kleine philosophische Schriften, collected and edited by G. F. Hagen (1736–1740).
- Philosophia practica universalis (1738–1739).
- Jus naturae and Jus Gentium. Magdeburg, 1740–1748.
  - English trans.: Marcel Thomann, trans. Jus naturae. NY: Olms, 1972.
- Wolff, Christian (1746). Elementa matheseos universae (in Latin). Vol. 2. Verona: Dionigi Ramanzini.
  - Wolff, Christian (1746). Elementa matheseos universae (in Latin). Vol. 3. Verona: Dionigi Ramanzini.
  - Wolff, Christian (1751). Elementa matheseos universae (in Latin). Vol. 4. Verona: Dionigi Ramanzini.
- Jus Gentium Methodo Scientifica Pertractum (The Law of Nations According to the Scientific Method, 1749).
- Philosophia moralis (1750–1753).

Wolff's complete writings have been published since 1962 in an annotated reprint collection:

- Gesammelte Werke, Jean École et al. (eds.), 3 series (German, Latin, and Materials), Hildesheim-[Zürich-]New York: Olms, 1962–.

This includes a volume that unites the three most important older biographies of Wolff.

An excellent modern edition of the famous Halle speech on Chinese philosophy is:

- Oratio de Sinarum philosophia practica / Rede über die praktische Philosophie der Chinesen, Michael Albrecht (ed.), Hamburg: Meiner, 1985.

== See also ==
- Alexander Gottlieb Baumgarten
- Lorenz Christoph Mizler

Eponyms

- Mons Wolff

== Sources ==
- Blackwell, Richard J. "Christian Wolff's Doctrine of the Soul," Journal of the History of Ideas, 1961, 22: 339–354. in JSTOR
- Corr, Charles A. "Christian Wolff and Leibniz," Journal of the History of Ideas, April 1975, Vol. 36 Issue 2, pp 241–262 in JSTOR
- Goebel, Julius, "Christian Wolff and the Declaration of Independence", in Deutsch-Amerikanische Geschichtsblätter. Jahrbuch der Deutsch-Amerikanischen Gesellschaft von Illinois 18/19 (Jg. 1918/19), Chicago: Deutsch-Amerikanische Gesellschaft von Illinois, 1920, pp. 69–87, details Wolff's impact on the Declaration of Independence.
- Ingrao, Charles (October 1982). ""Barbarous Strangers": Hessian State and Society during the American Revolution". The American Historical Review. 87 (4): 954–976. doi:10.2307/1857901. JSTOR 1857901.
- Jolley, Nicholas, ed. The Cambridge Companion to Leibniz (Cambridge University Press, 1995), the standard source in English; includes biography and details of his work in many fields
- Richards, Robert J. "Christian Wolff's Prolegomena to Empirical and Rational Psychology: Translation and Commentary," Proceedings of the American Philosophical Society Vol. 124, No. 3 (30 June 1980), pp. 227–239 in JSTOR
- Vanzo, Alberto. "Christian Wolff and Experimental Philosophy", Oxford Studies in Early Modern Philosophy 7.
- European Journal of Law and Economics 4(2) (Summer 1997), special issue on Christian Wolff, reprinted 1998 in the Gesammelte Werke, 3rd Ser. Note especially the essays by Jürgen G. Backhaus ("Christian Wolff on Subsidiarity, the Division of Labor, and Social Welfare"), Wolfgang Drechsler ("Christian Wolff (1679–1754): A Biographical Essay"), Erik S. Reinert and Arno Mong Daastøl ("Exploring the Genesis of Economic Innovations: The religious Gestalt-Switch and the Duty to Invent as Preconditions for Economic Growth"), and Peter R. Senn ("Christian Wolff in the Pre-History of the Social Sciences").
