= Johann Ulrich von Cramer =

German judge, legal scholar and Enlightenment philosopher

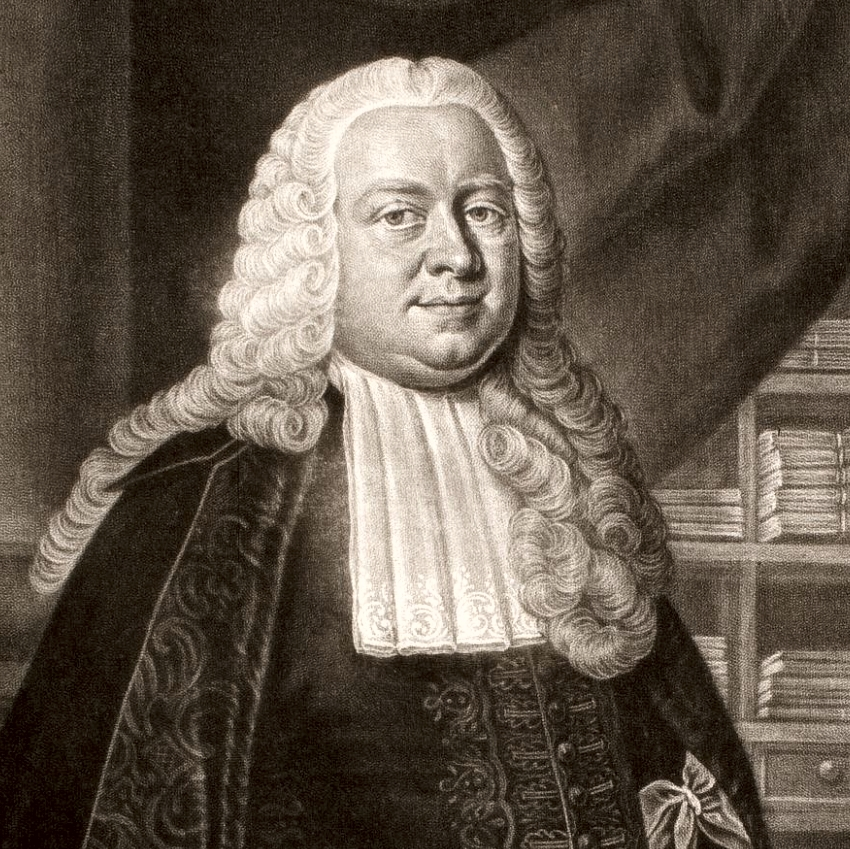
Johann Ulrich von Cramer, by Johann Jacob Haid.

Johann Ulrich von Cramer (8 November 1706 – 18 June 1772) was an eminent German judge, legal scholar, and Enlightenment philosopher.

== Biography ==
Cramer was the most important representative of Wolffianism in the area of law; he was first a university professor at the University of Marburg and then one of the highest judges of the Holy Roman Empire, both in Vienna and Wetzlar.

== Works ==
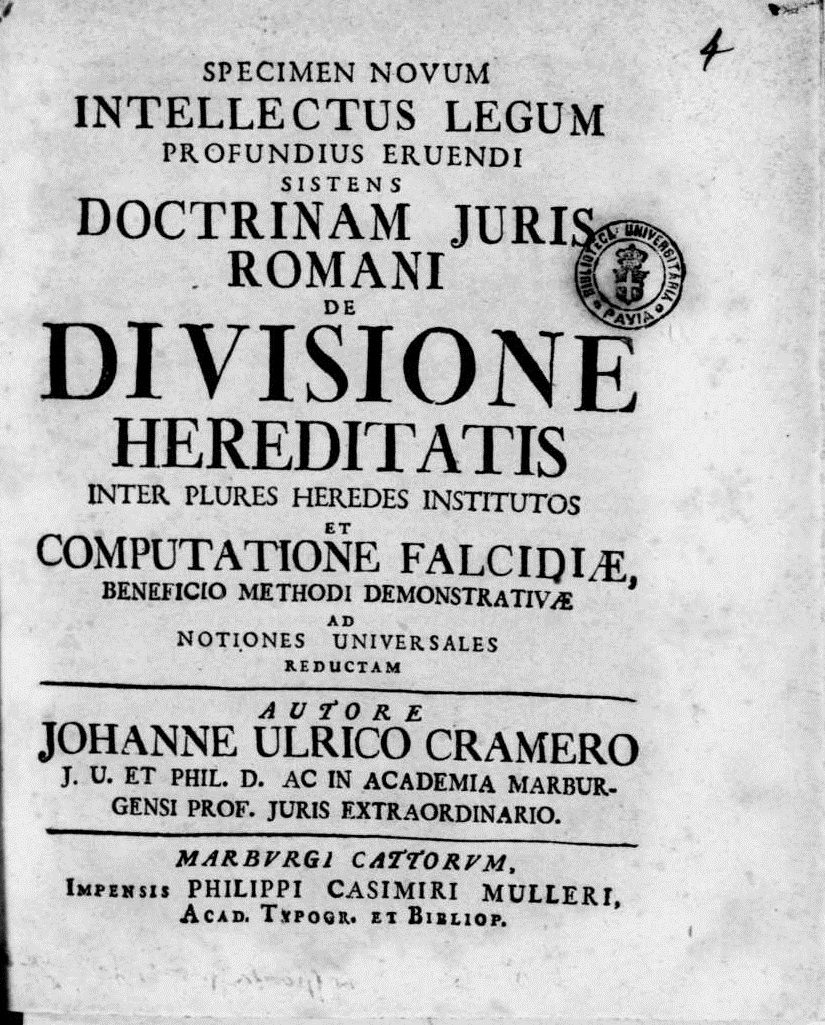
Specimen novum intellectus legum profundius eruendi, 1732

- JCramer, Johann Ulrich von. Opuscula, 5 vols., Wolfgang Drechsler (ed.). Christian Wolff, Gesammelte Werke, IIIrd series, vol. 34, pts. 1–5, Hildesheim - Zürich - New York: Olms, 1996.
- Cramer, Johann Ulrich von. Sammlung juristischer Ausführungen einiger vertheidigten Rechts-Sachen, welche bey denen höchsten Reichs-Gerichtern durch den Druck bekandt gemacht worden. - Wetzlar, 1759. digital
