= Otto Kaiser =

Otto Kaiser may refer to:

- Otto Kaiser (scholar) (1924–2017), German Old Testament scholar
- Otto Kaiser (figure skater) (1901–1977), Austrian pair skater
