= Carlota Perez =

Venezuelan economist (born 1939)

Carlota Elena Pérez Pérez
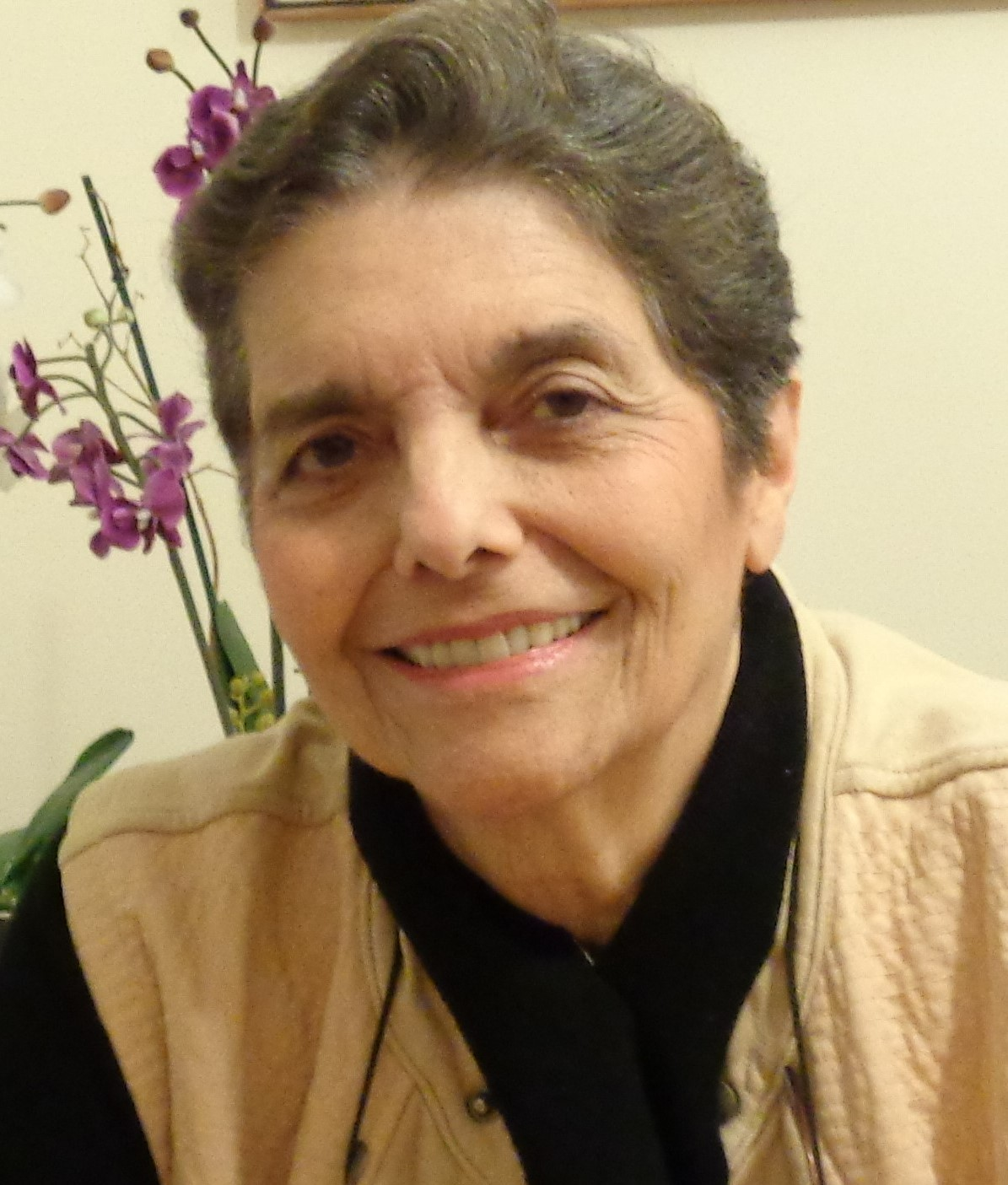
- Perez in 2015
- Born: September 20, 1939 (age 87); Caracas, Venezuela

Academic background
- Education: San Francisco State University (M.A., 1985)
- Influences: Joseph Schumpeter, Christopher Freeman

Academic work
- Discipline: Economics of Innovation
- School or tradition: Neo-Schumpeterian
- Institutions: University College London (Institute for Innovation and Public Purpose), University of Sussex (SPRU), Tallinn University of Technology, London School of Economics, University of Cambridge
- Awards: Silver Kondratieff Medal (2012), Honorary Doctorate Utrecht University (2021)
- Website: carlotaperez.org

Carlota Perez (Spanish: Carlota Pérez; born September 20, 1939, in Caracas) is a British-Venezuelan scholar specialized in technology and socio-economic development. Her research focuses on the concept of techno-economic paradigm shifts and the theory of great surges, a further development of Schumpeter's work on Kondratieff waves. In 2012 she was awarded the Silver Kondratieff Medal by the International N. D. Kondratieff Foundation and in 2021 she was awarded an Honorary Doctorate by Utrecht University.

== Career ==
Perez is currently Honorary Professor at the Institute for Innovation and Public Purpose (IIPP) at University College London; Honorary Professor at SPRU, University of Sussex; and Adjunct Professor of Technology and Socio-Economic Development at Tallinn University of Technology (TalTEch), Tallinn, Estonia. She is also the Academic-in-Residence at Anthemis UK. From 2013 to 2016 she was Centennial Professor at the London School of Economics. Prior to that she was affiliated to CERF (Cambridge Endowment for Research in Finance) and the Judge Business School at the University of Cambridge. She regularly gives visiting lectures at other universities around the world.

Her career began at the Central University of Venezuela where she studied the structural causes of the energy crisis in the mid-1970s and then in the civil service at the Institute of Foreign Trade in relation to the technology aspects of the North-South Dialogue (1975–1977). As founding Director of Technology in the Ministry of Industry (1980–1983), she established the first venture capital agency, FINTEC. She has been consultant to most of the major public and private companies in Venezuela, in particular to INTEVEP, the Research and Development affiliate of PDVSA, the national petroleum company.

As international consultant, she has worked for various multilateral organizations, including the OECD, the United Nations Conference on Trade and Development, UNESCO, United Nations Industrial Development Organization, the United Nations Development Programme, the Andean Pact and the World Bank. She has also acted as consultant for major corporations (including IBM, Ericsson, Telefónica, Cisco, Sogeti, ING Bank and the cooperative Mondragon), industry associations, ministries and councils of industry, Science and Technology, R&D institutes and development banks in many countries in Latin America and in other regions (notably Canada, Norway and Estonia). Several elements of the European Union's Lisbon Strategy were based on her work, and in 2015 she was Chair of the European Commission’s Horizon 2020 Expert Group for Green Growth and Jobs.

== Theory ==
Carlota Perez is a neo-Schumpeterian and Christopher Freeman was her mentor and husband, with whom she closely collaborated. Her articles, from the early 1980s, have contributed to the present understanding of the relationship between basic innovations, technical and institutional change, and economic development. Her 2002 book Technological Revolutions and Financial Capital has had a very positive response from academics as well as from the financial and the technology-based business communities. It has been translated into Chinese, Korean, Russian and Spanish. The book has contributed to a Schumpeterian understanding of the link between innovation and financial dynamics. In it Perez, speaking from 2002, lays out a history of five technological revolutions that follow a similar pattern of bang, bust and, hopefully, renewal.

[The early decades are] a time of innovation for production capital; the new paradigm opens vast opportunities for new products, processes and services as well as for rejuvenating the old. It is also – and especially – the time of fast development of the infrastructure of the new paradigm, which facilitates a host of other related innovations. So during this period, financial capital generates a powerful magnet to attract investment into the new areas, hence accelerating the hold of the paradigm on what becomes the 'new economy'. Financial capital then acts as the agent of massive creative destruction.

[...] In a world of capital gains, real estate bubbles and foreign adventures with money, all notion of the real value of anything is lost. Uncontrollable asset inflation sets in while debt mount at a reckless rhythm; much of it to enter the casino.

[After the bubbles collapse and recessions set in, government steps in to regulate and foster] the recoupling of financial and production capital […] When this is effectively achieved, innovation and growth can take place across the whole productive spectrum and financial wealth may take its share in the profits in what is clearly a positive sum game. Less harmonious frameworks […] rather than a golden age, a gilded age), still under the aegis of financial capital, can occur, maintaining some of the previous tensions.

— Carlota Perez, Technological Revolutions and Financial Capital, p. 75-6

Since the 2010s Perez has been studying the historical role of the state in previous revolutions bringing about such golden ages as the Victorian boom, the Belle Epoque and the Post War prosperity. She has identified the importance of giving directionality to the technological potential installed in the early decades of each revolution and of the role of changing lifestyles in creating new employment. She now proposes that the direction should be smart, green, fair and global growth to unleash a global sustainable golden age of the information revolution

In 2000 Perez co-founded The Other Canon, a center and network for heterodox economics research, with - amongst others - main founder and executive chairman Erik Reinert. Having collaborated with Mariana Mazzucato for the past decade, she was the founding Honorary Professor at Mazzucato's new Institute for Innovation and Public Purpose at UCL, England, where she does research and gives lectures in the Master's of Public Administration programmes.

Techno-economic paradigm shifts

In her 2002 work Technological Revolutions and Financial Capital, Perez explains her theory about techno-economic paradigm shifts that revolve around technology revolution, technical innovation, economy and finance, and society. Techno-economic paradigm shifts are brought upon by the technological revolution. Perez defines technological revolution as a powerful and highly visible cluster of new and dynamic technologies, products, and industries capable of bringing about an upheaval in the whole fabric of the economy and propelling a long-term upsurge of development. Every time a technological revolution takes place a massive replacement of one set of technologies by another also occurs. It can be a substitution through modernizations of existing equipment, processes, and ways of operation. Every technological revolution included changes in people, in the way organizations were run and what new skills were needed, each technological revolution was breaking old habits.

Techno-economic paradigms consist of two parts. It is an ‘economic’ best practice because each technological transformation brings with it a major shift in the relative price structure that guides economic agents toward the intensive use of the more powerful new inputs and technologies. It is a ‘paradigm,’ because it defines the model and the territory for ‘normal’ innovative practice, promising success to those that follow the principles incarnate in the core industries of the revolution. Each technological revolution comes with new industries, products, and infrastructures that help to shape the new set of innovative practices (techno-economic paradigms) which in turn helps different stakeholders to make better decisions during the time period that the set of technologies is relevant. It is a best-practice model for applying a particular technological revolution in the most effective way and when it is adopted by the majority it becomes a common-sense or new normal base to organize activities and institutions.

Social and financial aspects of techno-economic paradigm shifts

In order for the techno-economic paradigm to take effect, changes have to happen within the society. The new technology that comes with the technological revolution has to be accepted by society. The new products, the new services have to have consumers and users, without them the innovative technology would not take over and become a technological revolution that needs a new set of rules and common sense bases to organize the activities. The changes in technology will eventually bring changes in governance, society, ideologies, and culture, they will include changes in regulatory frameworks affecting markets and economic activities, they will redesign a whole lot of institutions (government organizations, companies), there will be a need for new financial regulations and education. Society is opposed to the new set of rules and ways of doing things, even though they were received as a bright new set of opportunities because it is recognized as a threat to the established way of doing things in society, firms, and institutions. The changes are faster in the economy because there the profits and growth are driving the change, it is not the case within the society. The blockage is caused by routine, ideology, and vested interests and that takes time to change. The social tensions are even multiplied by great social costs in the form of lost jobs and skills as well as moving operations from one place to another.

A key factor in enabling technological revolutions and the emergence of new techno-economic paradigms is the role of finance. Such transformations often occur when innovations allow tasks to be performed more simply and cost-effectively, frequently with the aim of improving profitability. For these changes to take hold, sufficient capital must be available to support investments in new technologies that depart from established routines and introduce more substantial shifts. Investors, in turn, must view these opportunities as potentially worthwhile, whether through profit, strategic advantage, or long-term growth, and be willing to fund experimentation, product development, or expansion.

At the same time, large and established companies often prioritize incremental improvements to existing processes and technologies. While these investments can enhance efficiency and competitiveness, they may be less likely to produce the kind of far-reaching or disruptive changes that redefine how activities are carried out.

== Bibliography ==
- Carlota Perez, Leo Johnson, Art Kleiner. Are We on the Verge of a Golden Age?. August 28, 2017.
- Carlota Perez. Technological Revolutions and Financial Capital: The Dynamics of Bubbles and Golden Ages. London: Elgar 2002. (ISBN 1-84376-331-1)
- Wolfgang Drechsler, Rainer Kattel and Erik S. Reinert, eds. Techno-Economic Paradigms: Essays in Honour of Carlota Perez. London: Anthem, 2009. (ISBN 9781843317852)
  - Includes essays by Christopher Freeman, Bengt-Åke Lundvall, Giovanni Dosi, Richard R. Nelson and others.
- Carlota Perez.Technological revolutions and techno-economic paradigms.: in Working Papers in Technology Governance and Economic Dynamics, Working Paper No. 20, Tallinn: Norway and Tallinn University of Technology, Tallinn 2009.

== See also ==
- List of Venezuelans
