= The Other Canon Foundation =

Economic thinktank

The Other Canon Foundation is a center and network for research of heterodox economics founded by Erik Reinert. The name refers to the founders' message of there being another economic canon, alternative to the ruling neoclassical economics. Their suggestions, they claim, are valid for and can be applicated in the first, second and third world.

== History ==
The Other Canon was founded in 2000 by Erik Reinert and 10 co-founders with different backgrounds in economics and social sciences. The founders also have distinct backgrounds coming from North America, Latin America, Asia, Eastern and Western Europe. Notable names among them are Wolfgang Drechsler, Carlota Perez and Geoffrey Hodgson. In addition to the executive chairman Erik Reinert and the earlier mentioned Drechsler, the current executive board also employs Rainer Kattel.

== Theories and influences ==
The ideological foundation of The Other Canon is not defined in a left-right perspective, claiming both sides have fallen into the same traps failing to explain and develop valid theories for today's economics. Central to the group is the Theory of Uneven Development, which aims to explain how and why the international economic landscape (of rich and poor nations) is as it is today. History of Economic Policy is used as an important tool in this process.

The Other Canon is highly eclectic and gathers ideas from many authors of various epochs. Joseph Schumpeter, John Maynard Keynes, Karl Marx, Gunnar Myrdal, Gustav von Schmoller, Werner Sombart, Nicholas Kaldor, Max Weber and Adam Smith (for considerations of the primary sector) are among the theorists to have influenced The Other Canon.

In accordance with Schumpeter, The Other Canon emphasizes the role of "man the producer" over "man the consumer" and intends to seek the reasons for growth and innovation rather than seeing it as something innate to capital and a simple result of adding it to human labour. They argue that the state is needed to stimulate entrepreneurship to maximise growth. The importance of role of the state is also underlined in development economics. In his book How Rich Countries Got Rich ... and Why Poor Countries Stay Poor (2007), Reinert criticises liberal economists for ignoring empirical evidence when they promote free-trade as the solution to third world countries. He claims poor countries should, and should be allowed to, use protectionism to build up their own industries until they can compete internationally and that the state should be involved in this process.

== Differences to and criticism of the mainstream economics ==
Much of The Others Canon's criticism of the mainstream economics regards the focus on equilibrium and the static, as well as what the neoclassical models takes as given (perfect information, perfect foresight, constant returns to scale and no diversity/likeness of economic activity). Conforming with Schumpeterian theory The Other Canon emphasises the constant change in the economy and that entrepreneurs and capitalists all the time create temporary monopolies based on advantages of knowledge and/or uncertain assumptions about the future. The fact that mainstream economics sees innovation and novelty, and hence growth (of which capitalism is absolutely dependent), as exogenous phenomena does not fall lightly with The Other Canon who sees these factors as pivotal to the economy and something that is maximised through stimulation in the form of state policy. The Other Canon claims reintroducing increasing and diminishing (decreasing) returns to scale can help us understand the economic development and why neo-classical economy has failed to explain the uneven development of nations. Reinerts claims poor country's concentrating their production on industries with diminishing returns to scale will lead them to become more inefficient the more they invest while the opposite thing will happen to the rich countries with their primarily increasing returns to scale industries. This, he argues, is why following Ricardian Economics, mainly his theory of comparative advantage, will, instead of leading to the factor price equalisation neo-liberals profess, in fact usher poor countries into "specialising in being poor and inefficient". Paul Krugman, however, takes use of increasing returns to scale in his New Trade Theory to explain the success of the industrialised countries, but leaves out diminishing returns to scale explaining the misery of the Third World. The view of the economy as largely independent from society and the financial sector not being distinct from the real economy are also disputed by The Other Canon claiming that the economy is indeed embedded into society and that conflicts between the financial sector are normal and hence must be regulated.

== Publishing ==
Since 2009, The Other Canon has its own book publishing series with Anthem Press in London, called TAOCS - The Anthem Other Canon Series. So far, publications include

- a new biography of Joseph Alois Schumpeter by Schumpeter Society chairman Esben Sloth Andersen
- a Festschrift for Carlota Perez, on Techno-Economic Paradigms, edited by Wolfgang Drechsler and others
- a re-edition of the complete English works of Ragnar Nurkse and a volume on Nurkse edited by Rainer Kattel and others
- a new edition of Bengt-Åke Lundvall's work on National Innovation Systems

and others.
