= Rainer Kattel =

Estonian political scientist

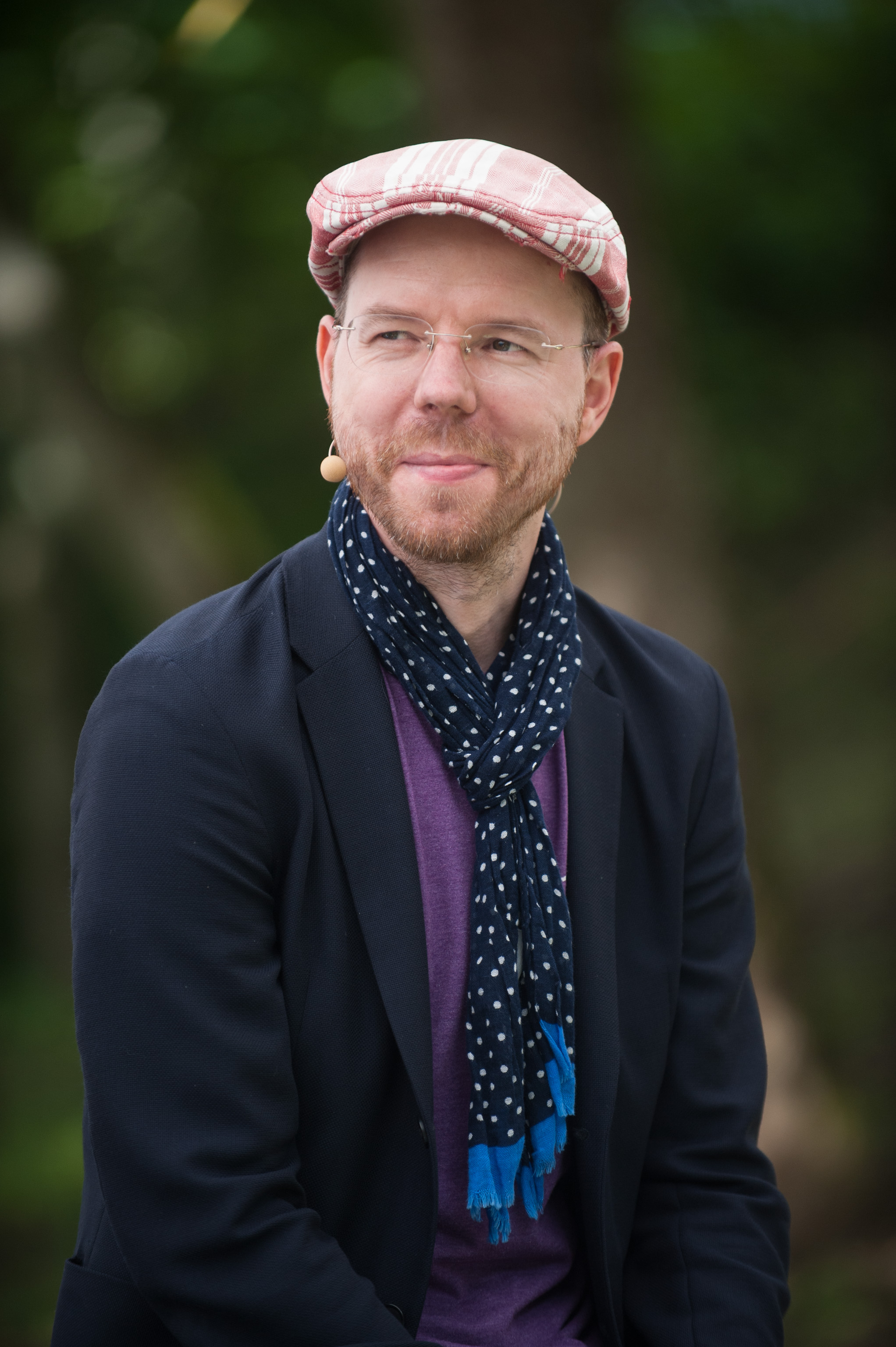
- Kattel at Arvamusfestival, 2014
- Born: 20 March 1974 (age 51); Tartu, Estonia
- Education: University of Tartu, University of Marburg
- Scientific career
- Fields: Public administration, innovation, digital governance
- Institutions: Institute for Innovation and Public Purpose and Tallinn University of Technology

Rainer Kattel (born 20 March 1974) is an Estonian academic and science administrator. He is professor of Innovation and Public Governance at Institute for Innovation and Public Purpose, UCL, and Research Professor and Chair of Innovation Policy and Technology Governance at Tallinn University of Technology. In 2015-16, he was a visiting professor at Columbia University's Earth Institute.

Kattel was born in Tartu, Estonia, and attended the University of Tartu and, for several years, the University of Marburg, Germany, on a DAAD scholarship. He obtained a BA in a specially designed major, Political Philosophy, an MA in Classics, and a Ph.D. in Public Administration (as the BA under the supervision of Wolfgang Drechsler), all with the highest distinction, "summa cum laude" or equivalent. After some research positions at the University of Tartu, he was elected, in 2002, aged 28, to a full professorship and chair in Public Management and European Studies at TUT's Ragnar Nurkse School of Innovation and Governance (as it is now called), which he subsequently headed for ten years, 2004-2014. In 2007, he was elected "Faculty Member of the Year".

Kattel is one of the main protagonists of the Estonian innovation strategy and policy (especially as concerns Biotechnology and ICT); he was a member of the Innovation Policy Council, Research and Development Council of the Republic of Estonia, as well as a member of the Estonian Biotechnology Expert Group of the Ministry of Economic Affairs. Internationally, Kattel has worked mostly as a consultant for the UNDP (e.g. national development plans of Moldova and Kazakhstan). Between 2002 and 2006, Kattel was also Senior Research Fellow at Estonia's leading public policy think-tank, PRAXIS. Kattel is a founding member of the executive board of The Other Canon, a center and network for heterodox economics research, along with Wolfgang Drechsler and main founder and executive chairman Erik Reinert.

Kattel was a founding board member of ETAG, Estonia's new grant-making institution for science funding. He directed two EU 7th Framework Programmes in Estonia, FESSUD and LIPSE. His critical regular opinion pieces in the national daily, Eesti Päevaleht, and his many commentaries or panel participation on television, gained him a general national and also international audience as well. He is a member of TUT's kuratoorium (Board of Governors) and was a key figure in the 2015 fight over the installation of a new rector.

== Selected publications in English ==
- Techno-Economic Paradigms: Essays in Honour of Carlota Perez (co-editor), Anthem, London, 2009. (ISBN 9781843317852)
- Creative Destruction Management: Meeting the Challenges of the Techno-Economic Paradigm Shift (with Tarmo Kalvet, ed.), Praxis, Tallinn, 2007.
- Knowledge-based Economy and ICT-related Education in Estonia: Overview of the Current Situation and Challenges for the Educational System (with Tarmo Kalvet), Praxis, Tallinn, 2006.
- Made in Estonia (with Marek Tiits and Tarmo Kalvet), IBS, Tallinn, 2006.
- Knowledge-based Economy and ICT Education in Estonia (with Tarmo Kalvet), Estonian Information Technology Foundation, Tallinn, 2005.
- Enhancing the Capacities to Govern. Challenges Facing the Central and Eastern European Countries. Editor (with Bryane Michaels and Wolfgang Drechsler), NISPAcee, Bratislava, 2004.
- Competitiveness of the Estonian Economy and its Future Outlooks. Research and Development and Innovation Policy Report (with Marek Tiits and Tarmo Kalvet). Research and Development Council of the Republic of Estonia, Tallinn, 2003, 2nd edn. 2005.
- The Constitution of the Polis. Tartu: University of Tartu Press, 2001.
