= Otto Kaiser (scholar) =

German Old Testament scholar (1924–2017)

Otto Kaiser (30 November 1924 – 14 December 2017) was a German Old Testament scholar.

== Biography ==
=== Education ===
Kaiser was born in Prenzlau, Germany, where he attended the Gymnasium in Eberswalde and went to the University of Berlin to study medicine, as well as philosophy with Nicolai Hartmann. He served in World War II on the Eastern Front and was wounded. Returning, he studied Protestant theology and Oriental Studies and Philosophy at the University of Tübingen. He received his Doctor of Divinity degree in 1961 and his habilitation less than a year later. He holds honorary doctorates from the University of Jena, the University of Tartu, and the University of Salzburg, as well as the Bundesverdienstkreuz 1st Class.

=== Career ===
Called to a professorship at the University of Marburg, the oldest Protestant university in the world with one of the most distinguished Divinity Schools in Germany, he soon received the main Chair of Old Testament, which, in spite of many calls to other universities, he held until his retirement. Kaiser's work stands in the tradition of Rudolf Bultmann; he sees theology as "the study of the human reflection of the experience of the Divine in time and space." He has written a complete, three-volume theology of the Old Testament, as well as the leading one- and three-volume introductions into Old Testament Studies in German; among his many special areas are the Book of Job, Ecclesiastes, the Apocrypha, and Sirach. Kaiser is also a leading scholar on ancient and modern philosophy, particularly on Kant, Hegel, and toward the end of his career, Nietzsche, Plato, and Aristotle.

== Bibliography ==
Selected works include:

- Ideologie und Glaube. Eine Gefährdung christlichen Glaubens am alttestamentlichen Beispiel aufgezeigt. Stuttgart: Radius, 1984 (key work on ideology)
- Der Mensch unter dem Schicksal. Studien zur Geschichte, Theologie und Gegenwartsbedeutung der Weisheit. Beihefte zur Zeitschrift für die alttestamentliche Wissenschaft. Berlin: de Gruyter, 1985
- Der Gott des Alten Testaments. Theologie des Alten Testaments. Wesen und Wirkung, Göttingen: Vandenhoeck & Ruprecht, 1993–2003, in 3 vols.:

- vol. 1: Grundlegung, 1993
- vol. 2: Jahwe, der Gott Israels, Schöpfer der Welt und des Menschen, 1998
- vol. 3: Jahwes Gerechtigkeit, 2003

- "Zwischen Interpretation und Überinterpretation: Vom Ethos des Auslegers". In Variations herméneutiques, 6 (Mai), 1997, pp. 53–70 (important essay on exegesis, interpretation, hermeneutics, and semiotics)
- "Die Rede von Gott im Zeitalter des Nihilismus." In Vielseitigkeit des Alten Testaments (FS Georg Sauer 70). James Alfred Loader / Hans Volker Kieweler, eds. Frankfurt etc.: Peter Lang, 1999, pp. 411–425 (brilliant essay on theology and faith during times of nihilism)
- Die alttestamentlichen Apokryphen. Eine Einleitung in Grundzügen. Gütersloh: Kaiser / GVH, 2000
- Einführung in die exegetischen Methoden (with Gottfried Adam and Werner Georg Kümmel). Gütersloh: Kaiser / GVH, 2000
- "Die Furcht und die Liebe Gottes. Ein Versuch, die Ethik Ben Siras mit der des Apostels Paulus zu vergleichen." In Ben Sira's God. Proceedings of the International Ben Sira Conference, Durham - Ushaw College 2001. Renate Egger-Wenzel, ed. Beihefte zur Zeitschrift für die alttestamentliche Wissenschaft, vol. 321. Berlin - New York: de Gruyter, 2002, pp. 39–75
- Zwischen Athen und Jerusalem. Studien zur griechischen und biblischen Theologie, ihrer Eigenart und ihrem Verhältnis. Beihefte zur Zeitschrift für die alttestamentliche Wissenschaft, vol. 320. Berlin - New York: de Gruyter, 2003
- Jenseits des Nihilismus. Christliche Existenz nach der Postmoderne. Stuttgart: Radius, 2004
- Weisheit für das Leben. Das Buch JESUS SIRACH übersetzt und eingeleitet. Stuttgart: Radius, 2005

=== In English ===
- "Deus absconditus and Deus revelatus. Three Difficult Narratives in the Pentateuch." In Shall Not the Judge of All the Earth Do What Is Right? Studies on the Nature of God in Tribute to James L. Crenshaw. David Penchansky / Paul L. Redditt, eds. Winona Lake, IN: Eisenbrauns, 2000, pp. 73–88
- "Covenant and Law in Ben Sira." In Covenant as Context. Essays in Honour of E.W. Nicholson. A.D.H. Mayes and R.B. Salters, eds. Oxford: Oxford University Press, 2003, pp. 235–260

=== Festschriften ===
- "Wer ist wie du, HERR, unter den Göttern?" Studien zur Theologie und Religionsgeschichte Israels. Festschrift für Otto Kaiser zum 70. Geburtstag. Ingo Kottsieper et al., eds. Göttingen: Vandenhoeck & Ruprecht, 1994
- Paradiama. Essays in Honor of Otto Kaiser on the Occasion of his 75th Birthday. Wolfgang Drechsler, ed. Trames, vol. 3 (53/48), no. 3 (Fall 1999)
- Gerechtigkeit und Leben im hellenistischen Zeitalter. Symposium anläßlich des 75. Geburtstags von Otto Kaiser. Jörg Jeremias, ed. Beihefte zur Zeitschrift für die alttestamentliche Wissenschaft, vol. 296. Berlin - New York: de Gruyter, 2001
- Gott und Mensch im Dialog. Festschrift für Otto Kaiser zum 80. Geburtstag. 2 vols. Markus Witte, ed. BZAW 345/I-II. Berlin – New York: de Gruyter, 2004
