= List of internet organizations =

This is a list of internet organisations, or organizations that develop recommendations, standards, and technology related to the internet, deploy infrastructure and services, and address other major issues.

== Standards development and broad-based advocacy and educational organizations ==
- IAB (Internet Architecture Board)
- ICANN (Internet Corporation for Assigned Names and Numbers)
- IANA (Internet Assigned Numbers Authority)
- IESG (Internet Engineering Steering Group)
- IETF (Internet Engineering Task Force)
- IRTF (Internet Research Task Force)
- ISOC (Internet Society)
- NANOG (North American Network Operators' Group)
- NRO (Number Resource Organization)
- W3C (World Wide Web Consortium)
- WHATWG (Web Hypertext Application Technology Working Group)
- OTF (Open Technology Fund)
- EFF (Electronic Frontier Foundation)

== Regional Internet Registries (RIRs) ==
- AfriNIC (African Network Information Centre)
- ARIN (American Registry for Internet Numbers)
- APNIC (Asia-Pacific Network Information Centre)
- LACNIC (Latin America and Caribbean Network Information Centre)
- RIPE (Réseaux IP Européens Network Coordination Centre)

== United Nations bodies ==
- Internet Governance Forum
- World Summit on the Information Society
- Working Group on Internet Governance

== Research and education organizations ==
- Merit (Merit Network, Inc.)
- NLR (National LambdaRail)
- Internet2 (aka University Corporation for Advanced Internet Development)

== Accessibility and affordability initiatives ==
- Internet.org
- Alliance for Affordable Internet

== Commercial organizations ==
Commercial organizations that made early and significant contributions to the development of the internet or services available on the internet:

- Amazon.com
- AOL (America Online)
- Cloudflare
- eBay
- Facebook
- Flickr
- GitHub
- Google
- LinkedIn
- Netflix
- Network Solutions (NSI)
- Paypal
- Twitter
- Yahoo!
- YouTube
- Instagram
- SourceForge

== Historical organizations ==
Organizations that played an important role in the development of the internet in the past:

- Advanced Network and Services (ANS)
- DARPA (U.S. Defense Advanced Research Projects Agency)
- InterNIC
- NSF (U.S. National Science Foundation)
- PSINet
- UUNet
