= Anticipatory governance =

Anticipatory governance is a method of decision making that uses predictive measures to anticipate possible outcomes to then make decisions based on the data provided. Anticipatory governance is a system of governing that is made up of processes and institutions that rely on foresight and predictions to decrease risk and develop efficient methods to address events in their early conception or prevent them altogether.

== History and applications ==
Anticipatory governance is a concept that has been derived from terms of similar meaning, like forward engagement and forward deployment, which was a primary focus for decisions made by the North Atlantic Treaty Organization (NATO). More recently, anticipatory governance has become data oriented practice which allows citizens and governments to utilize data as contributions and evidence for decision making regarding various matters within society. For example, Finland has a Finnish parliamentary Committee for the Future, which takes advantage of foresight to predict and evaluate the impact of developments to the country.

Since 2001, the Millennium Project has initiated a project entitled the State of the Future Index, has been using a predictive methodology to foresee the future for global countries based on historical data, variables and indicators, such as GDP, annual population, literacy rates, population, and unemployment.

== Methodology ==
=== Four part system ===
Anticipatory governance is a system with four components. They allow the system to: use a foresight, have a networked system that integrates foresight and policy procedures, receive feedback in order to improve efficiency and knowledge, and allow for flexibility. By allowing for feedback, anticipatory governance can detect and assess the development of future programs and policy. Feedback can be done through audits, and assessments of performance. The anticipatory system must adapt to consider possibilities that result from the data and may appear to be untraditional to allow the system to be effective and depend on pragmatic data.

=== Indicators ===
Anticipatory governance utilizes various techniques to assess society which can evaluate the continuous information from knowledge based technologies, such as machine learning. Anticipatory governance also takes into consideration that the concept cannot predict the future certainly, however, it can account for several possible future avenues. In order to determine these possible avenues the following list of indicators are required: "aggregated averages, risk assessment, sensitivity analysis of factors or decisions driving the scenarios, identification of unacceptable scenarios or worst cases, and assessment of common and different impacts among the scenarios."

=== Big data ===
Anticipatory governance allows the state to use collected public information in order to determine predictive practices and draw conclusions based on this data. Data that is gathered by governments in large volumes can be considered Big data. Governments utilize predictive analytics to examine what kinds of behaviour and events that may occur as a result of this collected of data. Anticipatory governance can be used by enforcement agencies in order to proactively protect the public, for instance by estimating where future crimes may occur and identifying areas of improvement for law enforcement.

=== Variation ===
Anticipatory governance is not always focused on finding solution, rather it can be focused on a preventative method altogether. As a result of this methodology, anticipatory governance, can be an alternative to having the bureaucracy form specific groups to address issues, whereby, the issue can be avoided due to precise foresight. Furthermore, anticipatory governance can also be considered a precaution, in the sense that it is a practice for preparing for the possible future.

=== Actors ===
Anticipatory governance involves a governing body to implement its practice, such as government institutions and policies. For example, education governance utilizes policy instrumentation in order to gather data about students as a means of creating predictions to improve future education. However, anticipatory governance can also be applicable in similar instances by private companies and by smaller organizations. For instance, Hewlett Packard can determine which employees will leave the company and they are able to identify ways of preventing this turnover.

Primarily, anticipatory governance relies on data in order to derive predictive analytical evidence to support its practice, therefore, it is necessary to have an infrastructure that sustains the produced data, such as databases, coding, computational power, and algorithms. These infrastructures can be provided by private companies that have the resources and technologies to acquire and create them.

=== Ethics ===
There is type of ethical analysis related to anticipatory governance known as nano ethics (see Impact of nanotechnology). Under this category of nano ethics anticipatory governance falls under anticipatory ethics, which originated in the 1960s. Anticipatory ethics and governance addresses the ethical repercussions associated with technologies in their beginning stages. It assesses the risks that the technology might present and therefore can affect future decision making of such technology (see Predictive analytics).

Anticipatory governance in the concept of predictive analytics, data, and governing can be seen as controversial because its measures can be perceived as unethical. The practice of anticipatory governance presents its own ethical issues concerning the effects its methods have on the individuals that are influenced by it, such as discrimination and self-fulfilling prophecies. Anticipatory governance can also allow the secondary use of information by governments, which in some cases can impede on citizen liberties. Based on the information and data that is gathered by governments, they can utilize this data in unintended ways and unbeknownst to the citizen in order to practice anticipatory governance.

==== Shortcomings ====
Due to the fact that anticipatory governance can be considered hypothetical the certainty of the future is not definite, thus, there is a measure of doubt associated with the practice. For example, following the Great Depression, measures were taken within the United States economy to prevent a depression from ever occurring again, however, the market crash in 2008 still occurred, despite these measures. Anticipatory governance also supersedes information about people that may never happen in actual reality. By drawing conclusions based on anticipatory predictions certain groups in society face the consequences of this practice and are subject to prejudices by others within society. For example, predictive policing can target specific individuals within a society because the information provided by such analytics and technology, supports recidivism. Recidivism is the concept that people that have committed crimes are likely to recommit offences, thus becoming individuals of interest in predictive policing data (see Predictive policing). Anticipatory governance can also target specific people and places concerning policing, which affects the behaviours of people within these areas, such as enforcing self-fulfilling prophecies and discrimination.

Anticipatory governance raises the concern regarding the need for traditional governments. If anticipatory governance and its associated technologies, information, and data are used to govern and make decisions within nation states, it can alter the responsibilities of government. However, without the use of anticipatory governance the alternative is to utilize a reactive form of governance, which results in a decision making process that can take longer and lead to implications that are difficult to predict and prevent.

== See also ==
- Predictive policing
- Big data
- Predictive analytics
