= Erik S. Reinert =

Norwegian economist

Erik Steenfeldt Reinert
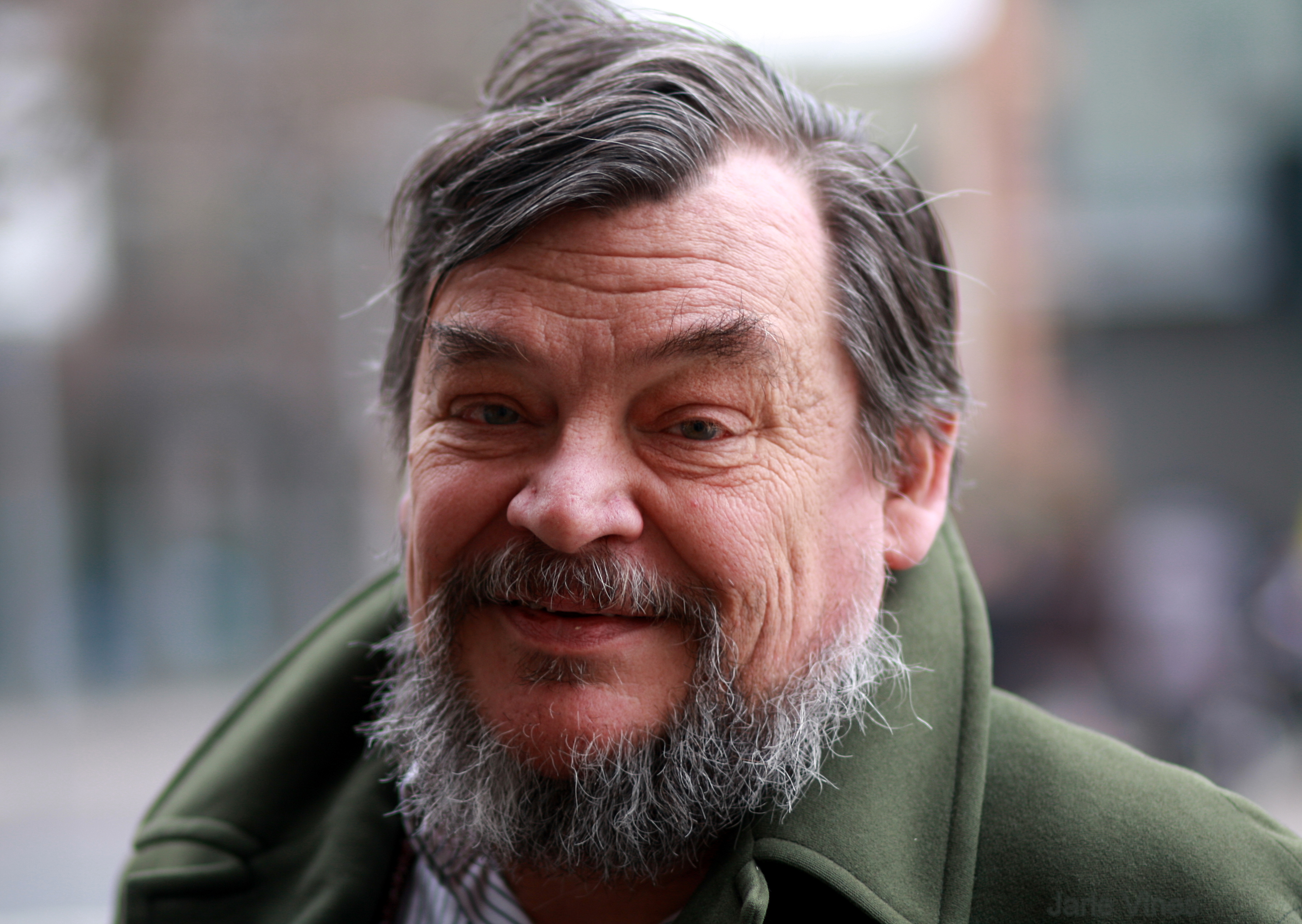
- Born: 15 February 1949 (age 77); Oslo, Norway
- Citizenship: Norway

Academic background
- Education: University of St. Gallen (BA); Harvard University (MBA); Cornell University (PhD)
- Influences: Friedrich List; Thorstein Veblen; Ragnar Nurkse; Joseph A. Schumpeter; Gunnar Myrdal; John Maynard Keynes

Academic work
- Discipline: Development economics Economic history
- Institutions: Tallinn University of Technology and Institute for Innovation and Public Purpose (IIPP) at University College London
- Awards: Gunnar Myrdal Prize
- Website: Information at IDEAS / RePEc

Erik Steenfeldt Reinert (born 15 February 1949) is a Norwegian economist, with development economics, economic history and history of economic policy as his specialties.

== Biography ==
Reinert was born in Oslo, attended the University of St. Gallen in Switzerland (where he studied economics), Harvard University (MBA), and Cornell University (Ph.D.). Already during his studies, he spent time in Latin America, working with a community development project in the Peruvian Andes, as well as in private industry. In 1972 he founded and later developed a small industrial firm, Matherson-Selig, (color sampling to the paint and automotive industries) in Bergamo, Italy. Adding production plants also in Norway and Finland, the company had become the largest of its kind in Europe when Reinert sold it in 1991. Reinert then worked for the STEP group in Oslo (1991–1995) and later became Director of Research of the Norsk Investorforum, a think tank set up by large Norwegian corporations (1995–2000). He also held a part-time position at The Centre for Development and the Environment (SUM), a research institution established by the University of Oslo. In 2000, he became the Executive Chairman of The Other Canon Foundation, a small center and network for heterodox economics research. Since 2004, he is Professor of Technology Governance and Development Strategies at the Tallinn University of Technology in Tallinn, Estonia, and since June 2020 he is Honorary Professor at the Institute for Innovation and Public Purpose (IIPP) at University College London. He lectures in five languages.

== Work ==
Reinert's research interests and publications - starting with his PhD thesis in 1980 - focus around the theory of uneven development and the history of economic thought and policy. As a consultant, Reinert's emphasis is on industrial and economic policy, the preconditions and management of innovations, and the relations between financial and production capital. According to his profile on the UCL web pages his work has taken him to more than 65 different countries.

His best known book, How Rich Countries Got Rich ... and Why Poor Countries Stay Poor (2007), has been widely reviewed and discussed. While some reviews, like those in Prospect Magazine, and The Economist, and others were dismissive many – including those from the developing countries – were positive and even those in publications generally opposed to Reinert's framework, such as Martin Wolf in the Financial Times, have called the book an important contribution to the debate. According to NORLA - a Norwegian organization concerned with of Norwegian books abroad, How Rich Countries Got Rich and Why Poor Countries Stay Poor has been translated into 27 languages.

The main message of the book is that neo-classical economics damage developing countries, mostly via adherence to the theory of comparative advantage of David Ricardo, an English economist of the 19th century. The theory posits the virtues of trade irrespective of the nature of the goods traded. Based on a long intellectual tradition - started by the Italian economists Giovanni Botero (1589) and Antonio Serra (1613), Reinert recalls that the country which trades increasing returns goods – e.g. high-end manufacture – has advantages over the country which trades diminishing returns goods – e.g. commodities. As Botero argued, the combination of economic diversity and adding value to raw materials are key elements that make nations rich. Since the Renaissance, argues Reinert, successful countries – including England and the United States - have first protected their nascent manufactures, then opened themselves to the world markets. Citing Friedrich List, a 19th-century German economist, Erik Reinert suggest that protectionism is thus important and that free trade is only mutually beneficial among countries of the same level of development. No country can achieve development without a sustained level of industrialization, and no poor country can achieve this in the strictures of free trade. For this reason, Reinert calls the Millennium development goals ‘palliative economics’, and presents historical records of conscient strategic behaviour of the colonial countries to keep their colonies de-industrialized. Reinert refers to former World Bank Chief Economist Justin Yifu Lin who affirms that ‘Except for a few oil-exporting countries, no countries have ever gotten rich without industrialization first’.

In 2008, Reinert received the annual Gunnar Myrdal Prize as best monograph in evolutionary political economy, and in 2010 he was the only Norwegian economist invited to the Cambridge opening conference of the Institute for New Economic Thinking, financed by George Soros.

Based on his experience in the Andes and studies of economic anthropology at Cornell University, Reinert has also worked as an adjunct professor at Sámi University of Applied Sciences in Kautokeino, Norway, and published on the economics of reindeer herding and climate change.

An original strand of research originated at the Kress Library at Harvard Business School, where his wife Fernanda worked as a librarian, Erik Reinert and his wife have been investigating the history of economic thought from the point of view of the record of economics books - published before 1750 and 1850 respectively - which reached more than 10 editions (including translations) before 1850. Several former economic bestsellers are today virtually unknown.

His work on the role of the state in economic growth has been republished in Chinese, Estonian, Russian, and Spanish.

A recurrent theme in the work of Erik Reinert is the cyclicality of economic thought and theories, and the role of development geography in economics.

== Selected publications ==
- Globalization, Economic Development and Inequality: An Alternative Perspective (2004), ed. Cheltenham: Edward Elgar.
- The Origins of Economic Development. How Schools of Economic Thought have Addressed Development (2005), co-edited with KS Jomo. London: Zed / New Delhi: Tulika.
- How Rich Countries Got Rich ... and Why Poor Countries Stay Poor (2007), London: Constable.
- Techno-Economic Paradigms: Essays in Honour of Carlota Perez (2009), co-ed. London: Anthem.
- Ragnar Nurkse (1907–2007): Classical Development Economics and its Relevance for Today (2009), co-ed. London: Anthem.
- Erik S. Reinert and Francesca Viano, Editors, Thorstein Veblen, Economics for an Age of Crises, Anthem Press, 2012.
- Ragnar Nurkse: Trade and Development (2009), co-ed. London: Anthem.
- Erik S. Reinert, Jayati Ghosh, Rainer Kattel, Editors, Handbook of Alternative Theories of Economic Development, Edward Elgar Publishing (May 25, 2018).
- With Rainer Kattel: The Visionary Realism of German Economics: From the Thirty Years' War to the Cold War, Anthem Press; 1 edition (February 15, 2019).
- With I. Kvangraven, Editors, A Modern Guide to Uneven Economic Development, Edward Elgar Publishing (January 10, 2023)

=== Downloadable working papers ===
- "The Qualitative Shift in European Integration: Towards Permanent Wage Pressures and a 'Latin-Americanization' of Europe?" (with Rainer Kattel), PRAXIS Working Paper No. 17, 2004.
- "Development and Social Goals: Balancing Aid and Development to Prevent 'Welfare Colonialism'", United Nation Department of Economic and Social Affairs, DESA Working Paper No. 14. 2006. Portuguese translation in Oikos. Revista de Economia Heterodoxa 4(4), pp. 45–67. 2005.
- "Evolutionary Economics, Classical Development Economics, and the History of Economic Policy: A Plea for Theorizing by Inclusion", Working Papers in Technology Governance and Economic Dynamics no. 1, The Other Canon Foundation; Tallinn University of Technology. 2006.
- The Relevance of Ragnar Nurkse and Classical Development Economics, with Rainer Kattel and Jan A. Kregel. Working Papers in Technology Governance and Economic Dynamics no. 21; The Other Canon Foundation, Tallinn University of Technology. March 2009.
- "The Terrible Simplifers: Common Origins of Financial Crises and Persistent Poverty in Economic Theory and the new '1848 Moment'", DESA Working Paper No. 88, United Nations. December 2009.
- "Neo-classical economics: A trail of economic destruction since the 1970s", RWER (60), pp. 2–17. 2012.
- 80 Economic Bestsellers before 1850: A Fresh Look at the History of Economic Thought, Erik S. Reinert, Kenneth Carpenter, Fernanda A. Reinert, Sophus A. Reinert, Working Papers in Technology Governance and Economic Dynamics no. 74, Tallinn University of Technology, Tallinn, MAY 2017.
- Altered States: Cartesian and Ricardian dreams. Reinert E.S., Di Fiore M., Saltelli A., Ravetz J.R. (2021), UCL Institute for Innovation and Public Purpose, Working Paper Series (IIPP WP 2021/07).

== Videos ==
The solution of everything, lecture focused on the 1613 book on the Wealth and Poverty of Nations of Antonio Serra, Arendal, Norway, August 9, 2013.

Fairness over time in a social perspective, Talk by Erik S. Reinert at the Joint Research Centre of the European Commission (EU) as part of the STS “Contro Corrente” series of seminars, 31 August 2016.

A development strategy in a time of changing ideologies, An open lecture by Erik S. Reinert, Kyiv, October 4, 2016.

Innovation Boot Camp - Workshop "Capitalism and Innovation: The Long View", Conference for young scholars 'Innovation, institutions and governance', September 16–19, 2017, Tallinn.

Presentation by Erik S. Reinert: "Resurrecting the economic ideas that produced the welfare state". Talk on the occasion of the celebration of the 70th birthday of Erik Reinert at University College London, Friday the 15 of February, 2019, with interventions from Mariana Mazzucato, Carlota Perez, Wolfgang Drechsler and Robert Wade.

Seminar "How Rich Countries Get Rich & How Poor Countries Stay Poor: A Rethink of Economic Orthodoxy", 5/6/2021, with former British Prime Minister Gordon Brown, Tallinn University of Technology professor Erik Reinert, Lord David Sainsbury, and professor Jacob Soll, University of Southern California, Dornsife Centre for Political Future.
