= Aghion–Howitt model =

Economic model of endogenous growth

Aghion–Howitt model (also known as the quality ladder model) is a three-sector economic model of endogenous growth theory under monopolistic competition that demonstrates the possibility of sustained economic growth driven by behavioral factors. In the model, technological change is the result of purposeful activity by economic agents investing in new technologies to earn profit. The model made a significant contribution to understanding how individual decisions affect economic growth rates, as well as the reasons why poor countries cannot catch up to rich ones. It showed that economic growth can be accompanied by a conflict of interest among different economic agents, and that protecting the interests of existing producers in the market can hinder technological change and economic growth. The theory was developed in 1990 by Philippe Aghion and Peter Howitt and had earned its authors a Nobel Memorial Prize in Economic Sciences in 2025.

== History ==
In the first models of economic growth (Solow model, Harrod–Domar model), exogenously given parameters like the "savings rate" and the "rate of technological advancement" were used, which ultimately determine the economy's growth rate. Researchers, however, wanted to base growth rates on internal (endogenous) factors, as models with a fixed savings rate had several drawbacks. These models did not explain the persistent differences in levels and rates of growth between developing and developed countries. The later Ramsey–Cass–Koopmans model and overlapping generations model overcame the limitation of an exogenous savings rate—this value was now determined by the individual decisions of economic agents. However, the rate of technological progress remained exogenous in these models, and largely for this reason, they also failed to explain cross-country differences. Models that explained economic growth by redefining "capital" and including human capital in the production function (e.g., the Mankiw–Romer–Weil model) do not explain all the differences between growth rates and development levels of different countries, even after accounting for differences in human capital. This was shown, for example, in research by R. Hall and C. Jones, J. De Long, and P. Romer. Attempts to directly include the variable of scientific progress into the production function ran into a limitation related to returns to scale. Under perfect competition with constant returns to scale, a firm's revenue was fully exhausted by payments to labor and capital. Therefore, Paul Romer proposed using monopolistic competition in models to explain the rate of technological progress.

In 1989, Paul Romer created the model of expanding variety of goods, but not all researchers agreed with his approach. In Romer's model, it is assumed that growth occurs due to an increase in the number of intermediate goods. Aghion and Howitt proposed a different approach. They focused on the fact that old types of goods are regularly and gradually replaced by new ones. When new technologies are developed, old ones are destroyed, a process Joseph Schumpeter called "creative destruction". Instead of candles, we now use light bulbs; instead of horse-drawn carriages, cars; instead of typewriters, computers, and so on. Therefore, the life cycle of innovations must be limited, and the monopoly power gained from developing a new product must be temporary. The Aghion–Howitt model, built on these premises (also known as the "quality ladder model"), was published in a paper by Philippe Aghion and Peter Howitt, "A Model of Growth Through Creative Destruction", in January 1990 as an NBER working paper and published in the journal Econometrica in 1992.

In 2025, the model's authors, Philippe Aghion and Peter Howitt, shared half of the Nobel Memorial Prize in Economic Sciences for the "theory of sustained growth through creative destruction," with the other half going to Joel Mokyr.

== Model description ==
=== Basic assumptions ===
The model considers a closed economy. Firms maximize their profit, and consumers maximize their utility. There are three sectors in the economy: intermediate product (intermediate goods), final product (final goods), and R&D. The intermediate goods sector operates under monopolistic competition. The final goods sector operates under perfect competition. The R&D sector sells its patents to the intermediate goods sector. Economic growth in the model occurs through an increase in the quality of intermediate goods. Time $\tau$ is continuous.

The model does not account for capital accumulation; output $y$ is assumed to be equal to consumption $c$: $y=c$.

Labor resources are considered constant over time $L=const$. $L=L_F+n$, where $L_F$ are the labor resources employed in production, and $n$ are the labor resources employed in the research sector.

All intermediate goods $x_j$ are, for simplicity, assumed to be equal: $x_j=x$ $\forall j$.

The production function for the intermediate good is linear with respect to labor resources and is described by the formula: $x=L_F$.

The production function for the final good exhibits diminishing marginal utility and is described by the following formula: $y=Ax^{\alpha}$, where $\alpha$ is the elasticity of output with respect to the intermediate product, $0<\alpha<1$, $\alpha = const$, $A$ is a technology parameter, which in turn is described by the formula: $A_t=A_0{\gamma}^t$, where $A_0$ is the initial technology level, $t$ is the generation of the intermediate product, $\gamma$ is a coefficient, $\gamma > 1$, $\gamma = const$.

The consumer's utility function in the model is chosen so that intertemporal preferences are linear:

$u(y)=\int\limits_{0}^{\infin} y_{\tau}e^{-r{\tau}}d\tau$, where $r$ is the consumer's rate of intertemporal preference (subjective discount rate), which is assumed in the model to be equal to the interest rate.

=== Research sector ===
Innovations arise depending on the labor resources $n$ employed in the research sector, but not linearly; rather, with a certain probability. The number of innovations $v$ follows a Poisson distribution:

$v\sim P(\lambda n)$, where ${\lambda}$ is the productivity of the research technology, $\lambda > 0$, $\lambda = const$.

The amount of labor in the research sector $n$ is determined by the following condition:

$w_t={\lambda}V_{t+1}$, where $t$ is the sequential number of the innovation, $w_t$ is the wage, $V_{t+1}$ is the expected discounted value (present value) of the $t+1$-th innovation.

$V_{t+1}$ is determined by the asset return equation:

$\left ( 1+ \frac{r}{\lambda n_{t+1}} \right )V_{t+1}=\frac{\pi_{t+1}}{\lambda n_{t+1}}$, where $\pi_{t+1}$ is the monopoly profit from possessing the $t+1$-th technology, $r$ is the interest rate.

=== The company's problem and production of intermediate and final goods ===
The final goods sector operates under perfect competition. From this, it follows that as a result of solving the company's problem (profit maximization), the price $p_x$ of the intermediate good $x$ is equal to its marginal productivity:

$p_x(t)=A_t {\alpha}x^{\alpha-1}$.

The firm developing the new product determines its profit as a monopolist:

$\pi_t=\underset{x}{\max}(p_x(t)x-w_tx)$.

From this, the demand function for labor resources in production $x=\tilde{x}({\omega}_t)$ is derived, where

- $\omega_t=\frac{w_t}{A_t}$ — wage per unit of productivity,
- $\tilde{x}=\frac{x_t}{A_t}$ — output of intermediate goods per unit of productivity,
- $\tilde{\pi}=\frac{\pi_t}{A_t}$ — profit per unit of productivity.

=== Labor market equilibrium and steady-state growth rate ===
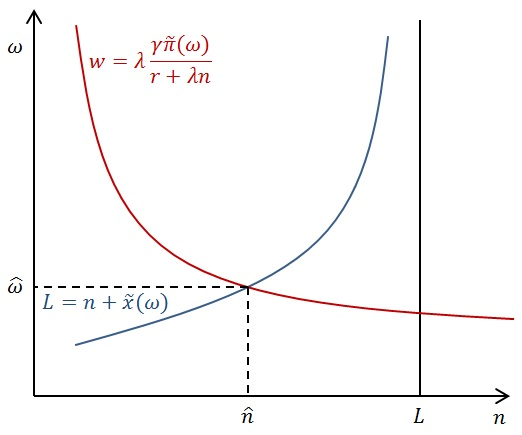
Aghion–Howitt model, labor market equilibrium

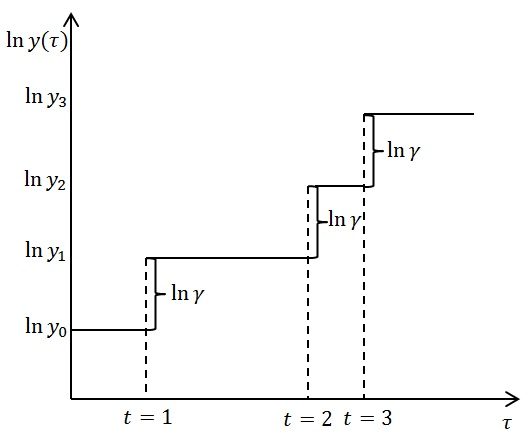
Aghion–Howitt model, output growth with the appearance of innovations

From the equation for $V_{t+1}$ and the profit maximization problem for $\pi_t$, the conditions for wage equality in the production and research sectors and the labor market equilibrium are obtained:

- $w_t={\lambda} \frac{\gamma \tilde{\pi}({\omega_{t+1}})}{r+\lambda n_{t+1}}$,
- $L=n_t+\tilde{x}(\omega_t)$.

In a steady state, $\omega_t=\omega_{t+1}=\omega$ and $n_t=n_{t+1}=n$, from which the equilibrium value $\hat n$ will be:

$\hat{n}=\frac {\gamma \frac{1-\alpha}{\alpha}L-\frac{r}{\lambda}}{1+\gamma \frac{1-\alpha}{\alpha}}$.

The labor market equilibrium in the model is shown in the graph. The x-axis represents employment in the R&D sector $n$, and the y-axis represents the efficiency wage $\omega$. The red curve represents the set of points where the no-arbitrage condition for wages between the production and research sectors is met. The blue curve represents the equilibrium states in the labor market. Since the red curve has a negative slope and the blue curve has a positive slope, a unique equilibrium state exists. The equilibrium level of employment in the R&D sector $\hat{n}$, on which the model's growth rate depends, increases as the interest rate $r$ decreases and as the size of the innovation $\gamma$, the productivity of labor in the R&D sector $\lambda$, and the labor resources $L$ increase.

Substituting the obtained solution into the production function for the final product, we get the expected value of the steady-state endogenous growth rate of the economy:

$E\biggl(\frac{\ln y_{\tau+1}}{\ln y_{\tau}}\biggr)=\lambda \hat{n}\ln \gamma$.

The growth of the logarithm of output with the appearance of innovations is shown in the graph. The x-axis represents time $\tau$, and the y-axis represents the natural logarithm of output $\ln y$. Growth is stochastic in nature, as innovations $t$ arise with a certain probability. When an innovation occurs, the logarithm of output jumps by the value $\ln \gamma$.

Since the model assumes that the rate of intertemporal preference is equal to the interest rate, the optimal growth rate coincides with the steady-state rate found above.

== Advantages, disadvantages, and further development ==
Economic growth in the model is a consequence of individuals' decisions, not an exogenously given variable, which is its clear advantage. Thanks to this, the Aghion–Howitt model explains differences in technological levels between countries much better than preceding models (Solow model, Ramsey–Cass–Koopmans model, overlapping generations model), which mostly predicted absolute or conditional convergence, meaning that poor countries should catch up to rich countries in their level of development. In the Aghion–Howitt model, neither absolute nor conditional convergence is observed, as growth rates do not fall with an increase in output, meaning poor countries cannot catch up to rich ones. In this, the model is similar to the model of expanding variety of goods.

Another common element of these models is the dependence of growth rates on the scale of the economy, namely, the volume of labor resources $L$. For example, Charles I. Jones showed that this does not correspond to empirical data. But in this case, it is not an obvious drawback, as it refers to the influence of the number of skilled workers on the growth of product quality. A number of researchers have tried to justify this effect by arguing that the more skilled workers there are in an economy, the faster economic growth occurs. Daron Acemoglu used the quality ladder model as a basis for building his own model explaining why wage rates for skilled workers in the United States did not fall, despite a manifold increase in the number of such workers.

The Aghion–Howitt model, unlike the model of expanding variety of goods, explains the Arrow replacement effect, which states that new firms have more incentive than firms that have already captured a certain market share to develop new products that displace the products produced by existing firms. An important feature of the model is the dependence of the cost of developing an innovation on the rate of economic growth, as the latter depends on the speed at which old goods are replaced by new ones. Due to its connection with institutional factors of growth, the Aghion–Howitt model has become the primary model for new institutionalists on issues of economic growth.

An important conclusion of the model is that economic growth can be accompanied by a conflict of interest among different economic agents. Since the development of new products leads to the loss of monopoly rents for firms already in the market, the latter will have an incentive to obstruct technological progress. If the owners of existing firms have significant political weight and the ability to influence economic policy, then protecting their interests will lead to a slowdown in economic growth (in the model's terms, this means a significant decrease in $\lambda$, as the introduction of new technologies becomes more costly). These ideas were later developed by Daron Acemoglu and James A. Robinson in their book Why Nations Fail. In it, examples of distorting economic policies that protect the interests of existing producers and thereby hinder progress include the restriction of factory and railway construction by the emperors of Austria-Hungary, similar measures in the Russian Empire, and the reforms of Cancrin.

== Sources ==
- Acemoglu, Daron; Robinson, James A. (2012). Why Nations Fail: The Origins of Power, Prosperity, and Poverty. New York: Crown Business. ISBN 978-0307719218.
- Acemoglu, Daron (2009). Introduction to Modern Economic Growth. Princeton, NJ: Princeton University Press. ISBN 978-0691132921.
- Barro, Robert J.; Sala-i-Martin, Xavier (2004). Economic Growth (2nd ed.). Cambridge, MA: MIT Press. ISBN 978-0262025539.
- Tumanova E. A.; Shagas N. L. (2004). Макроэкономика. Элементы продвинутого подхода [Macroeconomics. Elements of an advanced approach] (in Russian). Moscow: INFRA-M. p. 400. ISBN 5-1600-1864-6.
- Sharaev Yu. V. (2006). Теория экономического роста [Theory of economic growth] (in Russian). Moscow: Izdatel'skiy dom GU VShE. p. 254. ISBN 5-7598-0323-9.
- Acemoglu D. (1997). "Training and Innovation in an Imperfect Labour Market". The Review of Economic Studies. 64 (3): 445–464. doi:10.2307/2971723.
- Aghion P. M. (2018). Macmillan Publishers Ltd (ed.). "Shumpetarian Growth and Growth Policy Design". The New Palgrave Dictionary of Economics. London: Palgrave Macmillan UK: 12013–12019. ISBN 978-1-349-95188-8.
- Aghion P. M.; Howitt P. W. (1990). "A Model of Growth Through Creative Destruction". NBER Working Paper. doi:10.3386/w3223.
- Aghion P. M.; Howitt P. W. (1992). [httpsa://econpapers.repec.org/article/ecmemetrp/v_3a60_3ay_3a1992_3ai_3a2_3ap_3a323-51.htm "A Model of Growth Through Creative Destruction"]. Econometrica. 60 (2): 323–351.
- Behabib J. (2013). "Multiple equilibria in the Aghion-Howitt model". Research in Economics. 68 (2): 112–116. doi:10.1016/j.rie.2013.10.002.
- De Long J. B. (1988). "Productivity Growth, Convergence, and Welfare: Comment". The American Economic Review. 78 (5): 1138–1154. JSTOR 1807174.
- Hall R. E.; Jones C. I. (1996). [httpsa://papers.ssrn.com/sol3/papers.cfm?abstract_id=225600 "The Productivity of Nations"]. NBER Working Paper. doi:10.3386/w5812.
- Howitt P. W. (2018). Macmillan Publishers Ltd (ed.). "Endogenous Growth Theory". The New Palgrave Dictionary of Economics. London: Palgrave Macmillan UK: 3632–3636. ISBN 978-1-349-95188-8.
- Jones C. I. (1995). "R&D-Based Models of Economic Growth" (PDF). Journal of Political Economy. 103 (4): 759–784. doi:10.1086/262002.
- Romer P. M. (1989). "Endogenous Technological Change" (PDF). NBER Working Paper. doi:10.3386/w3210.
- Romer P. M. (1989). "Human Capital And Growth: Theory and Evidence" (PDF). NBER Working paper. doi:10.3386/w3173.
- Schumpeter J. A. (2014) [1942]. Capitalism, Socialism and Democracy. Floyd, Virginia: Impact Books. p. 431. ISBN 978-1617208652.
