= Research quotient =

Measurement of companies' innovation capability

Research quotient (RQ) is a measure of companies' innovation capability introduced in the 2008 article, R&D Returns Causality: Absorptive Capacity or Organizational IQ. The measure was originally referred to as IQ (innovation quotient), but because IQ and innovation quotient were already in use commercially, it was referred to as RQ in subsequent work. The motivating argument in the 2008 article was that the main prescription from absorptive capacity — that the more a company spends on R&D, the greater its ability to absorb spillovers from rivals' R&D, seemed implausible. This is because the greater the R&D, the closer a company gets to the knowledge frontier, and accordingly, the less likely it can use spillovers. Instead, Knott proposed and found, it was not that spending more led to higher returns, it was that companies have inherently different returns (RQ), and those with higher RQs spend more.

== Origins of RQ ==
RQ was introduced by Knott in the 2008 article, R&D Returns Causality: Absorptive Capacity or Organizational IQ, but at the time was referred to as "IQ" (innovation quotient) because IQ and innovation quotient were already in use commercially. Knott changed the name to "RQ" in subsequent work to avoid confusion. The motivating argument in the article was that the main prescription from absorptive capacity — that the more a company spends on R&D, the greater its ability to absorb spillovers from rivals' R&D, seemed implausible. This is because the greater the R&D, the closer a company gets to the knowledge frontier. Instead, Knott proposed and found, it was not that spending more led to higher returns, it was that companies have inherently different returns (RQ), and those with higher RQs spend more.

== Definition ==
RQ is derived from the production function in economics, which defines the relationship between firm inputs and their output. The version seen in microeconomic textbooks typically considers the two main tangible inputs: capital and labor, and is written as follows:

$$Y = K^\alpha L^\beta$$

Where $Y$ is output, $K$ is capital and $L$ is labor. The exponents, $\alpha$ and $\beta$, the output elasticity of capital and labor, respectively, characterize how productive each input is in generating output. A 1% increase in capital increases a firm's output $\alpha\%$; a 1% increase in labor increases a firm's output $\beta\%$.

RQ is obtained by expanding the production function to include the two important intangible inputs: R&D and advertising.

$$Y = K^\alpha L^\beta R^\gamma A^\delta$$

The raw measure for RQ, $\gamma$, is the output elasticity of R&D — the percentage increase in revenue from a 1% increase in R&D. It is obtained by random coefficients estimation of the production function, using eight-year windows of financial data for all publicly traded companies. A historical database of company RQs is available for academic use through Wharton Research Data Services (WRDS).

To support intuition, $\gamma$ is rescaled to match the human IQ scale. An RQ of 100 is the average across all U.S. public firms engaged in R&D in 2010. The majority of firms (67%) have RQs which fall between 85 and 115.

== RQ and optimal R&D ==
The economic foundation for RQ also allows companies to compute the optimal level of their R&D, as the partial derivative of profits with respect to R&D:

Ri* = (aγi / (1-δ))1/(1-γi)

== RQ and firm Value ==
The goal of company innovation is typically to increase market value. Because RQ is derived from the production function, it is straightforward to show analytically that increasing RQ increases market value. Empirical tests in the academic literature support that: contemporaneous and future market-to-book value (MTB) both increase with RQ, as do future monthly stock returns. Research for companies and investors is consistent with that: FCLT Global found that RQ was the second most important factor in predicting return on invested capital (ROIC); MSCI reported that companies with high RQ ratings, had better returns than companies with low RQ ratings. CNBC, as part of its RQ50 rankings, provided case studies of how companies in the same industry differed when one was a high RQ and the other low RQ.

== RQ and economic growth ==
Paul Romer's theory of endogenous growth, holds that economic growth is proportional to the level of R&D and the productivity of R&D. Since industrial R&D comprises 70% of U.S. R&D, it is not surprising that GDP growth tracks RQ. Cummings and Knott document a 65% decrease in mean company RQ over the period 1985-2015, which coincides with the decline in nominal GDP growth. This decline in RQ matches the decline in R&D productivity documented in Jones (1995)

Jones holds this decline is due to "fishing out" — the exhaustion of valuable ideas. If he is correct, then growth converges to zero in the long run. Kluppel and Knott tested Jones' theory and found no evidence of fishing out. Rather, they found mild evidence of increasing returns to knowledge. They then presented suggestive evidence that the decline in R&D productivity stems from companies becoming worse at R&D.
