= Why Nations Fail =

2012 book by Daron Acemoglu and James Robinson

Why Nations Fail: The Origins of Power, Prosperity, and Poverty
- Authors: Daron Acemoglu, James Robinson
- Language: English
- Genre: Comparative politics, Economics
- Publisher: Crown Business
- Publication date: March 20, 2012
- Publication place: United States
- Media type: Hardcover, Audiobook, Amazon Kindle
- Pages: 546
- ISBN: 0307719219
- OCLC: 729065001

Why Nations Fail: The Origins of Power, Prosperity, and Poverty, first published in 2012, is a book by Turkish-American economist Daron Acemoglu and British-American economist James A. Robinson, who in 2024 jointly received the Nobel Memorial Prize in Economic Sciences (alongside Simon Johnson) for their contribution in comparative studies of prosperity between nations. The book applies insights from institutional economics, development economics, and economic history to understand why nations develop differently, with some succeeding in the accumulation of power and prosperity and others failing. The authors present a wide range of historical case studies from all over the world.

== Context ==
=== Background ===
The book is the result of a synthesis of many years of research by Daron Acemoglu, on the theory of economic growth, and James Robinson, on the economies of Africa and Latin America, as well as research by many other authors. It contains an interpretation of the history of various countries, both extinct and modern, from the standpoint of a new institutional school. The central idea of many of the authors' works is the defining role of institutions in the achievement of a high level of welfare by countries. An earlier book by the authors, The Economic Origins of Dictatorship and Democracy, is devoted to the same, but it did not contain a large number of various historical examples.

=== Polemic against geographic economic theory ===
The authors enter into an "indirect polemical dispute with the authors of other theories explaining global inequality":

- Jeffrey Sachs and Jared Diamond's geographical economical theory
- Abhijit Banerjee and Esther Duflo's theory of ignorance of the elites,
- Seymour Martin Lipset and his modernization theory,

As well as various cultural theories: that of

- David Landes about the special cultural structure of the inhabitants of Northern Europe,
- David Fischer about the positive influence of British culture,
- Max Weber about the influence of Protestant ethic on economic development.

They most harshly criticized geographical theory as "unable to explain not only global inequality, in general," but also, the fact that many countries have been in stagnation for a long time, and then, at a certain point in time, began a rapid economic growth, although their geographical position did not change.

== Content ==
The book consists of 15 chapters.

=== Conditions for sustainable development ===
==== Comparative studies ====
Beginning with a description of the border towns Nogales, Arizona, and Nogales, Sonora, the authors question the reasons for the dramatic difference in living standards on either side of the Mexican-American border separating the two cities. The book focuses on how some countries have managed to achieve high levels of prosperity, while others have consistently failed at sustainable development.

==== Causes ====
Sustainable development is accompanied by a constant change and improvement of technologies — a process called scientific and technological progress. In search of the reasons why this occurs in some countries and not in others the authors come to the conclusion that for scientific and technological progress, it is necessary to protect the property rights of a wide strata of society and the ability to receive income from their enterprises and innovations including from patents for inventions. But as soon as a citizen receives a patent, he immediately becomes interested in that no one else patented a more perfect version of his invention, so he can receive income from his patent, forever. Therefore, for sustainable development, a mechanism is needed that does not allow him to do this, because, together, with the patent, he receives substantial wealth. The authors come to the conclusion that such a mechanism is pluralistic political institutions that allow wide sections of society to participate in governing the country. In this example, the inventor of the previous patent loses, but everyone else wins.

==== Pluralistic institutions ====
With pluralistic political institutions, a decision is made that is beneficial to the majority, which means that the inventor of the previous one will not be able to prevent a patent for a new invention and, thus, there will be a continuous improvement of technologies. The interpretation of economic growth, as a constant change of goods and technologies, was first proposed by Joseph Schumpeter, who called this process creative destruction. In the form of an economic model, this concept was implemented by Philippe Aghion and Peter Howitt in the Aghion–Howitt model, where the incentive for the development of new products is the monopoly profit from their production, which ends after the invention of a better product. Since only pluralistic political institutions can guarantee that the owners of existing monopolies, using their economic power, will not be able to block the introduction of new technologies, they, according to the authors, are a necessary condition for the country's transition to sustainable development. Another prerequisite is a sufficient level of centralization of power in the country, because, in the absence of this, political pluralism can turn into chaos. The theoretical basis of the authors' work is presented in a joint article, with Simon Johnson, and the authors also note the great influence of Douglass North's work on their views.

The authors support their position by analyzing the economic development of many modern and already disappeared countries and societies: the USA; medieval England , the Glorious Revolution and the British Empire; France; the Venetian Republic; the Roman Republic, and the Roman Empire; Austria-Hungary; Russian Empire, USSR and modern Russia; Spain and its many former colonies: Argentina, Venezuela, Guatemala, Colombia, Mexico and Peru; Brazil; colonial period of the Caribbean region; Maya civilization; Natufian culture; the Ottoman Empire and modern Turkey; Japan; North Korea and South Korea; the Ming and Qing empires, and modern China; the sultanates of Tidore, Ternate and Bakan, the island state of Ambon and other communities on the territory of modern Indonesia, and the consequences of the impact of the Dutch East India Company on them; Australia; Somalia and Afghanistan; the kingdoms of Aksum and modern Ethiopia; South Africa, Zimbabwe and Botswana; the kingdoms of the Congo and Cuba, and the modern Democratic Republic of the Congo; the states of Oyo, Dahomey and Ashanti, and modern Ghana; Sierra Leone; modern Egypt and Uzbekistan. Reviewers unanimously note the wealth of historical examples in the book.

=== Analysis of the economic development of different countries ===
In fifteen chapters, Acemoglu and Robinson try to examine which factors are responsible for the political and economic success or failure of states. They argue that the existing explanations about the emergence of prosperity and poverty, e.g. geography, climate, culture, religion, race, or the ignorance of political leaders are either insufficient or defective in explaining it.

Acemoglu and Robinson support their thesis by comparing country case studies. They identify countries that are similar in many of the above-mentioned factors, but because of different political and institutional choices become more or less prosperous. The most incisive example is Korea, which was divided into North Korea and South Korea in 1953. Both countries' economies have diverged completely, with South Korea becoming one of the richest countries in Asia while North Korea remains among the poorest. Further examples include the border cities Nogales, Sonora in Mexico and Nogales, Arizona in the United States. By referencing border cities, the authors analyze the impact of the institutional environment on the prosperity of people from the same geographical area and same culture.

Acemoglu and Robinson's major thesis is that economic prosperity depends above all on the inclusiveness of economic and political institutions. Institutions are "inclusive" when many people have a say in political decision-making, as opposed to cases where a small group of people control political institutions and are unwilling to change. They argue that a functioning democratic and pluralistic state guarantees the rule of law. The authors also argue that inclusive institutions promote economic prosperity because they provide an incentive structure that allows talents and creative ideas to be rewarded.

In contrast, the authors describe "extractive" institutions as ones that permit the elite to rule over and exploit others, extracting wealth from those who are not in the elite. Nations with a history of extractive institutions have not prospered, they argue, because entrepreneurs and citizens have less incentive to invest and innovate. One reason is that ruling elites are afraid of creative destruction—a term coined by Joseph Schumpeter—the ongoing process of annihilating old and bad institutions while generating new and good ones. Creative destruction would fabricate new groups which compete for power against ruling elites, who would lose their exclusive access to a country's economic and financial resources.

The authors use the example of the emergence of democratic pluralism, in which Parliament's authority over the Crown was established in Great Britain after the Glorious Revolution in 1688, as being critical for the Industrial Revolution. The book also tries to explain the recent economic boom in China using its framework. China's recent past does not contradict the book's argument: despite China's authoritarian regime, the economic growth in China is due to the increasingly inclusive economic policy by Deng Xiaoping, the architect of China's opening-up policy after the Cultural Revolution.

According to Acemoglu and Robinson's framework, economic growth will change the economic resource distribution and thus affect political institutions. Therefore, despite the current rapid growth, if China does not improve political balance, China is expected to collapse like the Soviet Union did in the early 1990s.

=== Extractive and Inclusive institutions ===
The decisive role for the development of countries, according to the authors, is played by political and economic institutions — a set of formal and informal rules and mechanisms for coercing individuals to comply with these rules that exist in society. Acemoglu and Robinson divide institutions into two large groups: Political and economic. The first regulate the distribution of powers between the various authorities in the country and the procedure for the formation of these bodies, and the second regulate the property relations of citizens. The concept of Acemoglu and Robinson consists in opposing two archetypes: the so-called "extractive" ("extracting", "squeezing") and "inclusive" ("including", "uniting") economic and political institutions, which, in both cases, reinforce and support each other.

==== Inclusive institutions ====
Inclusive economic institutions protect the property rights of wide sections of society not just the elite, they do not allow unjustified alienation of property, and they allow all citizens to participate in economic relations, in order to make a profit. Under the conditions of such institutions, workers are interested in increasing labour productivity. The first examples of such institutions are the commenda in the Venetian Republic and patents for inventions. The long-term existence of such economic institutions, according to the authors, is impossible, without inclusive political institutions that allow wide sections of society to participate in governing the country and make decisions that are beneficial to the majority. These institutions are the foundation of all modern liberal democracies. In the absence of such institutions, when political power is usurped by a small stratum of society, sooner or later, it will use this power to gain economic power to attack the property rights of others, and, therefore, to destroy inclusive economic institutions.

==== Extractive institutions ====
Extractive economic institutions exclude large segments of the population from the distribution of income from their own activities. They prevent everyone, except the elite, from benefiting from participation in economic relations, who, on the contrary, are allowed to even alienate the property of those who do not belong to the elite. Examples include slavery, serfdom, and encomienda. In the context of such institutions, workers have no incentive to increase labour productivity, since all or almost all of the additional income will be withdrawn by the elite. Such economic institutions are accompanied by extractive political institutions that exclude large sections of the population from governing the country and concentrate all political power in the hands of a narrow stratum of society (for example, the nobility). Examples are absolute monarchies and various types of dictatorial and totalitarian regimes, as well as authoritarian regimes, with external elements of democracy (constitution and elections), which are so widespread in the modern world, where power is supported by power structures: the army, the police, and dependent courts. The very fact that there are elections in a country does not mean that its institutions cannot be classified as extractive: competition can be dishonest, candidates' opportunities and their access to the media are unequal, and voting is conducted with numerous violations, and in this case the elections are just a spectacle, the ending of which is known, in advance.

== Theories ==
The book is based on two theories. The first explains what drives democratic and dictatorial regimes. The second explains why democratic regimes promote economic growth and dictatorial ones hold it back.

=== Drivers of democracy ===
Acemoglu and Robinson's account of democratization builds on their earlier game theoretic work. That paper models why countries swing between democracy and nondemocracy, drawing on the history of Western Europe and Latin America. It stresses the threat of revolution as a push toward democracy, and the elites' wish to limit redistribution as a push back toward nondemocratic rule.

The model keeps society simple. It has a small rich class and a large poor class, and a regime is either democratic or not. People care about the money they receive now and expect in the future, and each tries to maximize their own utility. The economy's output also varies from year to year, so revolution costs the rich less in a downturn.

A country starts out nondemocratic, with the rich ruling and setting the tax rate. In a two-stage sequential game, the rich first choose the tax rate and level of redistribution. The poor then decide whether to accept it or stage a costly revolution. Because the poor may prefer revolution, the rich have a reason to offer a rate that avoids one without giving up too much.

Democratization, in this model, is the rich willingly extending redistribution and the vote to the poor in order to head off a revolution. The threat of revolution is therefore a constant incentive for them to do so, and it grows when the poor's cost of revolting falls, when its benefits rise, or when the rich face harsher punishment if it succeeds.

=== How democracy affects economic performance ===
The second part of the book argues that inclusive political institutions lead to economic growth. The authors set out the argument more formally in an earlier paper, which tries to explain differences in development between countries with a single framework.

Political institutions, such as a constitution, set the de jure (written) distribution of political power, while the distribution of economic resources sets the de facto (actual) distribution. Both shape the economic institutions that govern production and, in turn, tomorrow's political institutions. Institutions today therefore determine growth and institutions tomorrow.

England before the Glorious Revolution is the standard example. The monarch dominated politics, but profits from growing international trade gave commercially engaged nobles and a rising merchant class real power. As these groups supplied much of the output and the monarch's tax income, they pushed institutions in their favor until they were strong enough to overthrow the monarchy and secure economic institutions that protected their interests.

In The Colonial Origins of Comparative Development, written with Simon Johnson of MIT, the authors treat colonial history as a natural experiment. Where disease made it hard for colonizers to survive, they tended to set up extractive regimes, which left those countries poor. Where survival was easier, they settled and copied the institutions of their home countries, as in Australia and the United States.

In a third paper, on the rise of Europe after 1500, the authors find that Transatlantic trade enriched a merchant class able to challenge monarchs. The effect was weaker where an absolutist monarch ruled, which they say explains why Spain fell behind England despite the same access to Atlantic trade.

Acemoglu and Robinson have said their theory is largely inspired by the work of the economist Douglass North and the political scientist Barry R. Weingast. In a 1989 paper, North and Weingast argued that the winners of historical conflicts shape institutions to protect their own interests. After the Glorious Revolution, they said, the winning merchant class set up property rights and limited the monarch's power, which promoted growth. North, Wallis and Weingast later called this law and order open access in a 2009 paper.

== Reception ==
The reviews below are notable responses, either directly or indirectly addressed towards the book, the authors, or the arguments made by the book. The section below is arranged in alphabetical order of the respondent's first name.

=== Arvind Subramanian ===
Indian economist Arvind Subramanian points out the potential problem of reverse causality in Acemoglu and Robinson's theory in his publication in The American Interest. Why Nations Fail takes political institutions as causes and economic performance as results for granted. However, according to Modernization theory, causation can also go the other way around—improvement of political institutions can also be a result of economic modernization. The book thus fails to explain why this alternative perspective does not work; however, a 2001 paper by Acemoglu and Johnson with frequent collaborator Simon Johnson introduced a two-stage regression test using colonial settler disease mortality as an instrument attempted to answer this question and is included in the book's works cited.

Subramanian also points out the limitation of the book to explain the recent economic development in China and India. Under an authoritarian regime (theoretically extractive political institution), China has achieved rapid economic development while democratic India (theoretically inclusive political institution) has lagged much behind. According to Subramanian, one can say that China and India are outliers or that it is still too early to decide (that is, China might collapse and India might catch up according to the book's prediction). However, it is still unsatisfying that the theory is unable to explain the situation of 1/3 of the world's population, and it is unlikely that China or India will change drastically in the near future, according to the prediction.

Acemoglu and Robinson counter that their theory distinguishes between political and economic institutions and that it is not political institutions that contribute to growth directly but economic institutions shaped by the political institutions. In the case of China, even though the political institutions on a higher level are far from inclusive, the incentive to reform Chinese economy does come from political institutions; in 1978 from Deng Xiaoping's opening up policy at the end of the internal political feud during the Cultural Revolution. This exactly fits into the theory that the change in political institutions has shaped economic institutions and thus has influenced economic performance. This economic growth is further expected to shape the political institutions in China in the future. One can only say that China is an outlier to the theory when in the future China becomes as wealthy as U.S. or Germany but still remains an authoritarian regime.

Regarding the case of India, the authors deny an equivalence between inclusive political institutions and electoral democracy. Electoral democracy is the de jure system adopted by a country while political institutions refer to the de facto structure and quality of the political system of a certain country. For example, India's political system has long been dominated by the Congress Party; the provision of public goods is preyed upon by political patrimonialism; various members of Lok Sabha (the Indian legislature) face criminal charges, and caste-based inequality still exists. The quality of democracy is very poor and thus the political institutions are flawed in India, which explains why economic institutions are equally poor and economic growth is stymied.

=== David R. Henderson ===
David R. Henderson wrote a generally positive review in Regulation but criticized the authors for inconsistency when talking about a central government's role in promoting development. In some parts of the book, the authors attribute the failure of the states like Afghanistan, Haiti and Nepal to the lack of a strong central government that imposes rule and order. However, in other parts of the book, the authors seem to embrace weak government for growth, as in the example of Somalia after losing its central government. In addition, Henderson asserts the authors have made two errors in the book about the United States. First, the authors falsely accuse "monopolists" like Rockefeller of being the extractive power. But in fact Rockefeller did not raise the price of oil but lowered the price to gain market share rather than to extract from the economy. Second, he says the authors are oblivious of the mainstream scholarship on American economic history between the American Civil War and civil rights movements in America. Rather than diverging from the rich North, the South was actually converging.

=== Francis Fukuyama ===
In his article in The American Interest, Francis Fukuyama criticized Acemoglu and Robinson's approach and argument for being very similar to a book by North, Wallis and Weingast in 2009, Violence and Social Orders. Fukuyama approves of the books' central conclusion, which is that the failure of economies are often due to institutions beneficial to elites to the detriment of others, instead of the leaders' ignorance on policy matters. However, Fukuyama contended that the bifurcation of states into being "inclusive" or "extractive" oversimplifies the problem. This approach, he argues, lumps different institutions such as property rights, courts, electoral democracy, an impersonal state, and access to education, thereby failing to unpack their individual effect and makes flawed comparisons between societies across centuries. A modern state and the rule of law, Fukuyama writes, are demonstrably beneficial to economic growth, but popular democracy in poor countries can foster clientelism, corruption and hinder development. Fukuyama also points out that historical facts (on Rome and the Glorious Revolution) used to support the argument was flawed. Finally, Fukuyama specifically pointed out that the argument by Acemoglu and Robinson does not apply to the case of modern China, as China has "extractive" institutions but still flourishes economically.

In response to Fukuyama's comments, Acemoglu and Robinson replied on their blog. First, they agreed that their work is inspired by North et al.'s work but explained that they build on and complement each other's work. Second, with reference to the criticism of oversimplification, they countered by describing the oversimplification as an approach to decompose complex political institutions; it is necessary to avoid focusing too narrowly on a single aspect of institutions. Last, on China, they attribute the rapid economic growth in China to the some (but yet limited) level of inclusiveness, as was also seen in the example of fast growth in the Soviet Union until the 1970s, but predicted that China will not reach per capita income comparable to those of Spain or Portugal with its current extractive institutions.

=== Jared Diamond ===
In Jared Diamond's book review on The New York Review of Books, he points out the narrow focus of the book's theory only on institutions, ignoring other factors like geography. One major issue of the authors' argument is endogeneity: if good political institutions explain economic growth, then what explains good political institutions in the first place? That is why Diamond lands on his own theory of geographical causes for developmental differences. He looks at tropical (central Africa and South America) vs. temperate areas (North and South Africa and North America) and believes that the differences of wealth of nations are caused by the weather conditions: for example, in tropical areas, diseases are more likely to develop and agricultural productivity is lower. Diamond's second criticism is that Acemoglu and Robinson seem to only focus on small events in history like the Glorious Revolution in Britain as the critical juncture for political inclusion, while ignoring the prosperity in Western Europe.

In response to Diamond's criticism, the authors reply that the arguments in the book do take geographical factors into account but that geography does not explain the different level of development. Acemoglu and Robinson simply take geography as an original factor a country is endowed with; how it affects a country's development still depends on institutions. They mention their theory of Reversal of Fortune: that once-poor countries (like the U.S., Australia, and Canada) have become rich despite poor natural endowments. They refute the theory of "resource curse"; what matters is the institutions that shape how a country uses its natural resources in historical processes.

Diamond rebutted Acemoglu and Robinson's response, reinforcing his claim of the book's errors. Diamond insists geographical factors dominate why countries are rich and poor today. For example, he mentions that the tropical diseases in Zambia keep male workers sick for a large portion of their lifetime, thus reducing their labor productivity significantly. He reinforces his point that geography determines local plantations and gave rise to ancient agrarian practices. Agricultural practice further shapes a sedentary lifestyle as well as social interaction, both of which shape social institutions that result in different economic performances across countries.

=== Jeffrey Sachs ===
According to Jeffrey Sachs, an American economist, the major problem of Why Nations Fail is that it focuses, too narrowly, on domestic political institutions and ignores other factors, such as technological progress and geopolitics. For example, geography plays an important role in shaping institutions and weak governments in West Africa may be seen as a consequence of the unnavigable rivers in the region. Sachs also questions Acemoglu and Robinson's assumption that authoritarian regimes cannot motivate economic growth. Several examples in Asia, including Singapore and South Korea, easily refute Acemoglu and Robinson's arguments that democratic political institutions are prerequisites for economic growth. Moreover, Acemoglu and Robinson overlook macroeconomic factors like technological progress (e.g. industrialization and information technology).

In response to Sachs' critique, Acemoglu and Robinson replied, on their book blog, with twelve specific points. First, on the role of geography, Acemoglu and Robinson agree that geography is crucial in shaping institutions but do not recognize a deterministic role of geography in economic performance. Second, on the positive role authoritarian governments can play in economic growth, especially in the case of China, the fast economic growth could be part of the catch-up effect. However, it does not mean that authoritarian governments are better than democratic governments, in promoting economic growth. It is still way too early, according to Acemoglu and Robinson, to draw a definite conclusion, solely based on the example of China. Last, on industrialization, they argue that industrialization is contingent upon institutions. Based on Acemoglu and Robinson's response, Sachs wrote a rebuttal on his personal website.

=== Paul Collier ===
Development economist Paul Collier from the University of Oxford reviewed the book for The Guardian. Collier's review summarizes two essential elements for growth from the book: first, a centralized state and second, inclusive political and economic institutions. Based on the case of China, a centralized state can draw a country out from poverty, but without inclusive institutions, such growth is not sustainable, as argued by Acemoglu and Robinson. Such a process is not natural but only happens when the elites are willing to cede power to the majority, under certain circumstances.

=== Peter Forbes ===
Peter Forbes reviewed the book for The Independent: "This book, by two U.S. economists, comes garlanded with praise by its obvious forebears – Jared Diamond, Ian Morris, Niall Ferguson, Charles C. Mann – and succeeds in making great sense of the history of the modern era, from the voyages of discovery to the present day." Besides singing high praises for the book, Forbes links the message of the book and contemporary politics in developed countries like the United States and the United Kingdom. Though the two countries are, by far, some of the most inclusive economies in the world, various parts of them are, by nature, extractive—for instance, the existence of a shadow banking system, of conglomerate manufacturers, and so on. He warns against extractive practices, under the guise of an inclusive economy.

=== Warren Bass ===
Warren Bass reviewed the book for the Washington Post, writing: "It's bracing, garrulous, wildly ambitious, and ultimately, hopeful. It may, in fact, be a bit of a masterpiece." Despite his applause, Bass also points out several imperfections of the book. First of all, the definition of extractive and inclusive institution is vague in a way that cannot be utilized in policymaking. Second, though Acemoglu and Robinson are ambitious in covering cases of all nations across history, this attempt is subjected to the scrutiny of regional experts and historians. For example, their accusation of Ottoman Empire as "highly absolutist" might not be correct, given the level of tolerance and diversity inside the Empire, as compared to its European counterparts.

=== William Easterly ===
In a mixed review of the book in the Wall Street Journal, William Easterly was generally supportive of the plausibility of the book's thesis but critiqued the book's failure to cite extant statistics-based evidence to support the validity of the historical case studies. For example, in the book's example about Congo, the stated reason Congo is impoverished is that Congo is close to slave trade shipping points. The approach of this historical case study only offers one data point. Moreover, Easterly also points out the danger of ex-post rationalization that the book only attributes different levels of development to institutions in a way a bit too neat. For example, to explain the fall of Venice, it could be the extractive regime, during the time, or it could also be the shift from Mediterranean trade to Atlantic trade. The historical case studies approach might be biased.

== Awards and honors ==
- 2012 Paddy Power And Total Politics Political Book Award (International Affairs)
- 2012 Financial Times and Goldman Sachs Business Book of the Year Award, Shortlist
- 2013 Lionel Gelber Prize, Longlist
- 2013 Arthur Ross Book Award, Honorable Mention

== Related works ==
- The Wealth of Nations by Adam Smith
- Guns, Germs, and Steel by Jared Diamond
- Collapse: How Societies Choose to Fail or Succeed also by Jared Diamond
- The Elusive Quest for Growth by William Easterly
- The Wealth and Poverty of Nations by David Landes
- How China Escaped the Poverty Trap by Yuen Yuen Ang
- Imperialism and the Developing World by Atul Kohli
- Violence and Social Orders by Douglass North, John Wallis, and Barry Weingast
- The Modern World-System, vols. 1–4 by Immanuel Wallerstein
- Acemoglu, Daron (2023). Power and progress: Our Thousand-Year Struggle Over Technology and Prosperity. Johnson Simon. London: Basic Books. ISBN 978-1-3998-0447-9.

== See also ==
- Critical juncture theory
- Environmental determinism
- Exit, Voice, and Loyalty
- Exit, Voice, and Loyalty Model
- Extractivism
- Lee thesis
- Modernization theory
- Resource curse
- States and Power in Africa
- World-systems theory
