= AK model =

Growth model in economics

The AK model of economic growth is an endogenous growth model used in the theory of economic growth, a subfield of modern macroeconomics. In the 1980s it became progressively clearer that the standard neoclassical exogenous growth models were theoretically unsatisfactory as tools to explore long run growth, as these models predicted economies without technological change and thus they would eventually converge to a steady state, with zero per capita growth. A fundamental reason for this is the diminishing return of capital; the key property of AK endogenous-growth model is the absence of diminishing returns to capital. In lieu of the diminishing returns of capital implied by the usual parameterizations of a Cobb–Douglas production function, the AK model uses a linear model where output is a linear function of capital. Its appearance in most textbooks is to introduce endogenous growth theory.

== Graphical representation of the model ==
The AK model production function is a special case of a Cobb–Douglas function with constant returns to scale.

$$Y=AK^aL^{1-a}\,$$

This equation shows a Cobb–Douglas function where Y represents the total production in an economy. A represents total factor productivity, K is capital, L is labor, and the parameter $a$ measures the output elasticity of capital. For the special case in which $a = 1$, the production function becomes linear in capital and does not have the property of decreasing returns to scale in the capital stock, which would prevail for any other value of the capital intensity between 0 and 1.

$n$ = population growth rate
$\delta\$ = depreciation
$k$ = capital per worker
$y$ = output/income per worker
$L$ = labor force
$s$ = saving rate

In an alternative form $Y=AK$, $K$ embodies both physical capital and human capital.

$$Y=AK\,$$

In the above equation A is the level of technology which is positive constant and K represents volume of capital. Hence, output per capita is:

$\frac{Y}{L}=A \cdot \frac{K}{L}$ i.e. $y = Ak$

The model implicitly assumes that the average product of capital is equal to marginal product of capital which is equivalent to:

$A > 0$

The model again assumes that labor force is growing at a constant rate ‘n’ and there is no depreciation of capital. (δ = 0 ) In this case, the basic differential equation of neo-classical growth model would be:

$k(t) = s \cdot f(k) - nk$

Hence, $\frac{k(t)}{k} = s \cdot \frac{f(k)}{k} - n$

But in the model $\frac{f(k)}{k} = A$

Thus, $\frac{k(t)}{k} = s \cdot A - n$

== See also ==
- Economic growth
- Human capital
- Harrod–Domar model
