= Richard Holden (economist) =

Australian economist (born 1974)

- Born: 2 December 1974 (age 51); Sydney, Australia
- Citizenship: Australian

Academic background
- Education: Harvard University; University of Sydney
- Doctoral advisor: Oliver Hart; Philippe Aghion

Academic work
- Discipline: Economics
- Institutions: UNSW
- Website: www.richardholden.org; Information at IDEAS / RePEc

Richard Holden (born 2 December 1974) is an Australian economist and Professor of Economics at the University of New South Wales. He was previously a faculty member at the University of Chicago and the Massachusetts Institute of Technology.

== Early life and education ==
Holden was born in Sydney, Australia and received his undergraduate degree from the University of Sydney, where he was awarded the university medal in economics. He received an A.M and Ph.D. from Harvard University.

== Career ==
Holden is Vice-Chancellor's Professor and Chief Societal Economist at UNSW, Director of the Manos Institute for Cognitive Economics, and President Emeritus of the Academy of the Social Sciences in Australia. He is currently editor of the Journal of Law and Economics and is formerly an Australian Research Council Future Fellow. He is a fellow of the Econometric Society and a fellow of the Academy of Social Sciences in Australia. Holden's research, which mainly is centralized around topics including organizational, political, and law economics have garnered attention from prominent newspapers including: The New York Times, The Economist, and others. He has over 50 publications and 15 working papers/papers under review. Prior to his heavy involvement in the world of academia, Holden worked as an associate and senior associate consultant at Bain & Company (1997–1998) followed by time as an analyst, then as vice president for Pacific Equity Partners (1998–2001).

He is a frequent media commentator and writes a weekly column for the Australian Financial Review.
