= Peter Howitt (set decorator) =

English set decorator (1928–2021)

- Born: 1928; London, England
- Died: 22 September 2021 (aged 93); Malta
- Occupation: Set decorator
- Years active: 1963-2002

Peter Howitt (1928 - 22 September 2021) was an English set decorator. He was nominated for four Academy Awards in the category Best Art Direction.

== Partial filmography ==
=== As set decorator ===
Academy Award nominations in bold

- Anne of the Thousand Days (1969)
- Revenge (1971)
- Assault (1971)
- **Mary, Queen of Scots** (1971) (nominated with Terence Marsh and Robert Cartwright)
- Follow Me! (1972)
- The Great Gatsby (1974)
- Superman (1978)
- Moonraker (1979)
- Superman II (1980)
- **Ragtime** (1981) (with John Graysmark, Patrizia von Brandenstein, Tony Reading, George DeTitta Sr. and George DeTitta Jr.)
- Evil Under the Sun (1982)
- The Pirates of Penzance (1983)
- The Lords of Discipline (1983)
- Never Say Never Again (1983)
- Indiana Jones and the Temple of Doom (1984)
- King David (1985)
- The Fourth Protocol (1987)
- **Who Framed Roger Rabbit** (1988) (with Elliot Scott)
- Indiana Jones and the Last Crusade (1989)
- White Hunter Black Heart (1990)
- Shining Through (1992)
- Just like a Woman (1992)
- Son of the Pink Panther (1993)
- Braveheart (1995)
- Impossible (1996)
- Fierce Creatures (1997)
- **Elizabeth** (1998) (with John Myhre)
- The Mummy (1999)
- The Four Feathers (2002)

=== As art director ===
- The Mikado (1967)
- Clash of the Titans (1981)
- Labyrinth (1986)

== See also ==
Peter Howitt (disambiguation)
