= Creative destruction =

Concept in economics

In economics, creative destruction (German: schöpferische Zerstörung) is a process in which new innovations replace and make older innovations obsolete.

The concept is usually identified with the economist Joseph Schumpeter, who derived it from the work of Karl Marx and popularized it as a theory of economic innovation and the business cycle. It is also sometimes known as Schumpeter's gale. In Marxian economic theory, the concept refers more broadly to the linked processes of the accumulation and annihilation of wealth under capitalism.

The German sociologist Werner Sombart has been credited with the first use of these terms in his work Krieg und Kapitalismus (War and Capitalism, 1913). In the earlier work of Marx, however, the idea of creative destruction or annihilation (Vernichtung) implies not only that capitalism destroys and reconfigures previous economic orders, but also that it must continuously devalue existing wealth (whether through war, dereliction, or regular and periodic economic crises) in order to clear the ground for the creation of new wealth.

In Capitalism, Socialism and Democracy (1942), Joseph Schumpeter developed the concept out of a careful reading of Marx's thought. In contrast with Marx – who argued that the creative-destructive forces unleashed by capitalism would eventually lead to its demise as a system – Schumpeter reinforced the evolutionary nature of capitalist economies, downplaying the concerns of static competition analysis (i.e., market concentration), and reinforcing the importance of dynamic competition analysis (i.e., threat of entry, new technologies and means of production, competition in dimensions different than price). In his words, "This process of Creative Destruction is the essential fact about capitalism. It is what capitalism consists in and what every capitalist concern has got to live in [...] The problem that is usually being visualized is how capitalism administers existing structures, whereas the relevant problem is how it creates and destroys them. As long as this is not recognized, the investigator does a meaningless job. As soon as it is recognized, his outlook on capitalist practice and its social results changes considerably". Despite this, the term subsequently gained popularity within mainstream economics as a description of processes such as downsizing to increase the efficiency and dynamism of a company. The Marxian usage has, however, been retained and further developed in the work of social scientists such as David Harvey, Marshall Berman, Manuel Castells and Daniele Archibugi.

In modern economics, creative destruction is one of the central concepts in the endogenous growth theory. In Why Nations Fail, a popular book on long-term economic development, Daron Acemoglu and James A. Robinson argue the major reason countries stagnate and go into decline is the willingness of the ruling elites to block creative destruction, a beneficial process that promotes innovation.

== History ==
=== By Karl Marx ===
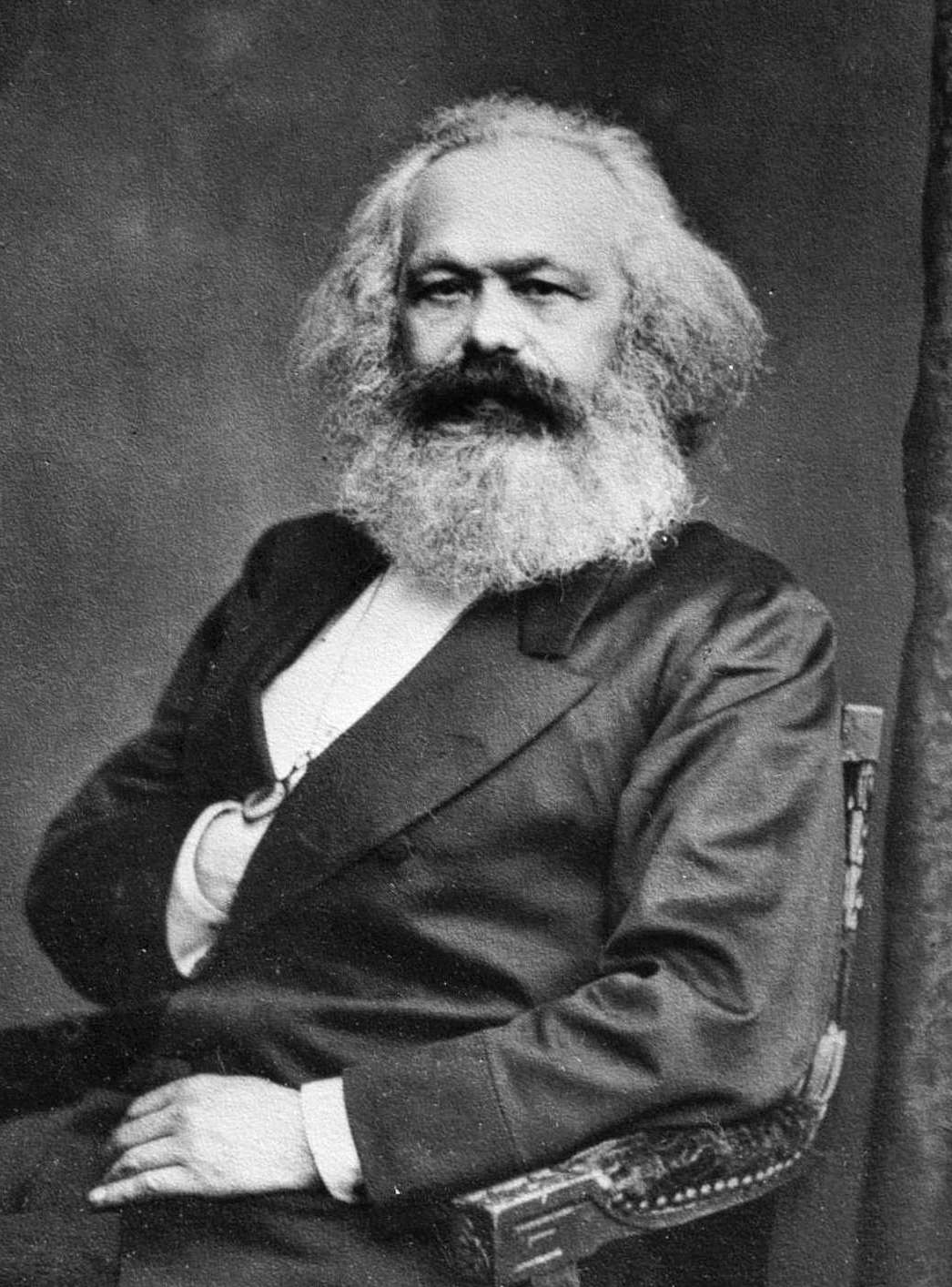
Karl Marx (1818–1883) never explicitly used the mark "creative destruction".

Although the modern term "creative destruction" is not used explicitly by Marx, it is largely derived from his analyses, particularly in the work of Werner Sombart, and of Joseph Schumpeter, who discussed at length the origin of the idea in Marx's work (see below).

In The Communist Manifesto of 1848, Karl Marx and Friedrich Engels described the crisis tendencies of capitalism in terms of "the enforced destruction of a mass of productive forces":

In these crises, a great part not only of existing production, but also of previously created productive forces, are periodically destroyed.

A few years later, in the Grundrisse, Marx was writing of "the violent destruction of capital not by relations external to it, but rather as a condition of its self-preservation". In other words, he establishes a necessary link between the generative or creative forces of production in capitalism and the destruction of capital value as one of the key ways in which capitalism attempts to overcome its internal contradictions:

These contradictions lead to explosions, cataclysms, crises, in which ... momentaneous suspension of labour and annihilation of a great portion of capital ... violently lead it back to the point where it is enabled [to go on] fully employing its productive powers without committing suicide.

In the Theories of Surplus Value ("Volume IV" of Das Kapital, 1863), Marx refines this theory to distinguish between scenarios where the destruction of (commodity) values affects either use values or exchange values or both together. The destruction of exchange value combined with the preservation of use value presents clear opportunities for new capital investment and hence for the repetition of the production-devaluation cycle:

the destruction of capital through crises means the depreciation of values which prevents them from later renewing their reproduction process as capital on the same scale. This is the ruinous effect of the fall in the prices of commodities. It does not cause the destruction of any use-values. What one loses, the other gains. Values used as capital are prevented from acting again as capital in the hands of the same person. The old capitalists go bankrupt. ... A large part of the nominal capital of the society, i.e., of the exchange-value of the existing capital, is once for all destroyed, although this very destruction, since it does not affect the use-value, may very much expedite the new reproduction. This is also the period during which moneyed interest enriches itself at the cost of industrial interest.

Social geographer David Harvey sums up the differences between Marx's usage of these concepts and Schumpeter's: "Both Karl Marx and Joseph Schumpeter wrote at length on the 'creative-destructive' tendencies inherent in capitalism. While Marx clearly admired capitalism's creativity he ... strongly emphasised its self-destructiveness. The Schumpeterians have all along gloried in capitalism's endless creativity while treating the destructiveness as mostly a matter of the normal costs of doing business".

=== By Werner Sombart ===
In philosophical terms, the concept of "creative destruction" is close to Hegel's concept of sublation. In German economic discourse it was taken up from Marx's writings by Werner Sombart, particularly in his 1913 text Krieg und Kapitalismus:

Again, however, from destruction a new spirit of creation arises; the scarcity of wood and the needs of everyday life... forced the discovery or invention of substitutes for wood, forced the use of coal for heating, forced the invention of coke for the production of iron.

=== Other early usage ===
In the Origin of Species, which was published in 1859, Charles Darwin wrote that the "extinction of old forms is the almost inevitable consequence of the production of new forms". One notable exception to this rule is how the extinction of the dinosaurs facilitated the adaptive radiation of mammals. In this case creation was the consequence, rather than the cause, of destruction.

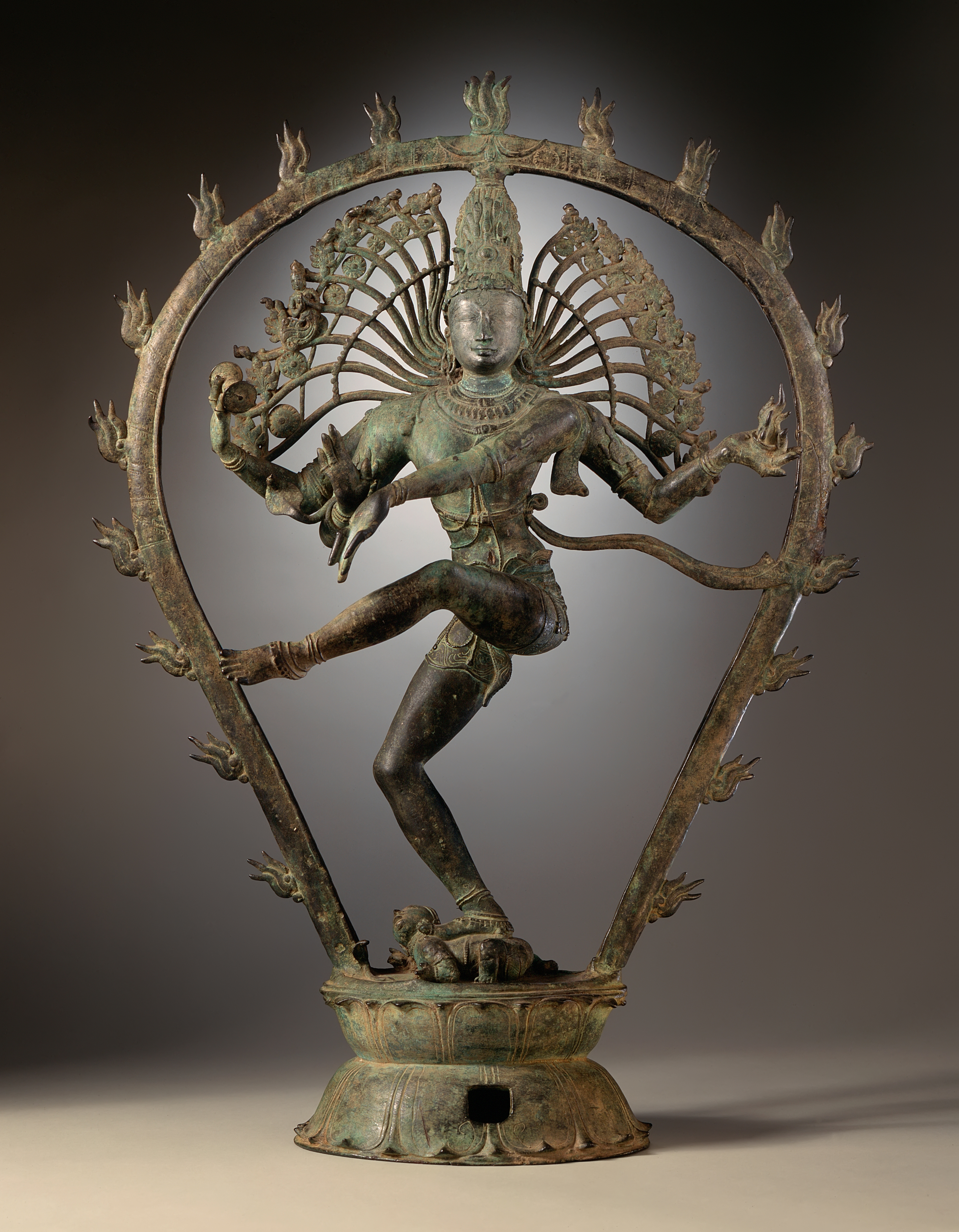
In Hinduism, the god Shiva is simultaneously destroyer and creator, portrayed as Shiva Nataraja (Lord of the Dance), which is proposed as the source of the Western notion of "creative destruction".

Hugo Reinert has argued that Sombart's formulation of the concept was influenced by Eastern mysticism, specifically the image of the Hindu god Shiva, who is presented in the paradoxical aspect of simultaneous destroyer and creator. Conceivably this influence passed from Johann Gottfried Herder, who brought Hindu thought to German philosophy in his Philosophy of Human History (Ideen zur Philosophie der Geschichte der Menschheit) (Herder 1790–92), specifically volume III, pp. 41–64. via Arthur Schopenhauer and the Orientalist Friedrich Maier through Friedrich Nietzsche's writings.

Nietzsche represented the creative destruction of modernity through the mythical figure of Dionysus, a figure whom he saw as at one and the same time "destructively creative" and "creatively destructive". In the following passage from On the Genealogy of Morality (1887), Nietzsche argues for a universal principle of a cycle of creation and destruction, such that every creative act has its destructive consequence:

But have you ever asked yourselves sufficiently how much the erection of every ideal on earth has cost? How much reality has had to be misunderstood and slandered, how many lies have had to be sanctified, how many consciences disturbed, how much "God" sacrificed every time? If a temple is to be erected a temple must be destroyed: that is the law – let anyone who can show me a case in which it is not fulfilled! – Friedrich Nietzsche, On the Genealogy of Morality

Other nineteenth-century formulations of this idea include Russian anarchist Mikhail Bakunin, who wrote in 1842, "The passion for destruction is a creative passion, too!" Note, however, that this earlier formulation might more accurately be termed "destructive creation", and differs sharply from Marx's and Schumpeter's formulations in its focus on the active destruction of the existing social and political order by human agents (as opposed to systemic forces or contradictions in the case of both Marx and Schumpeter).

== Association with Joseph Schumpeter ==
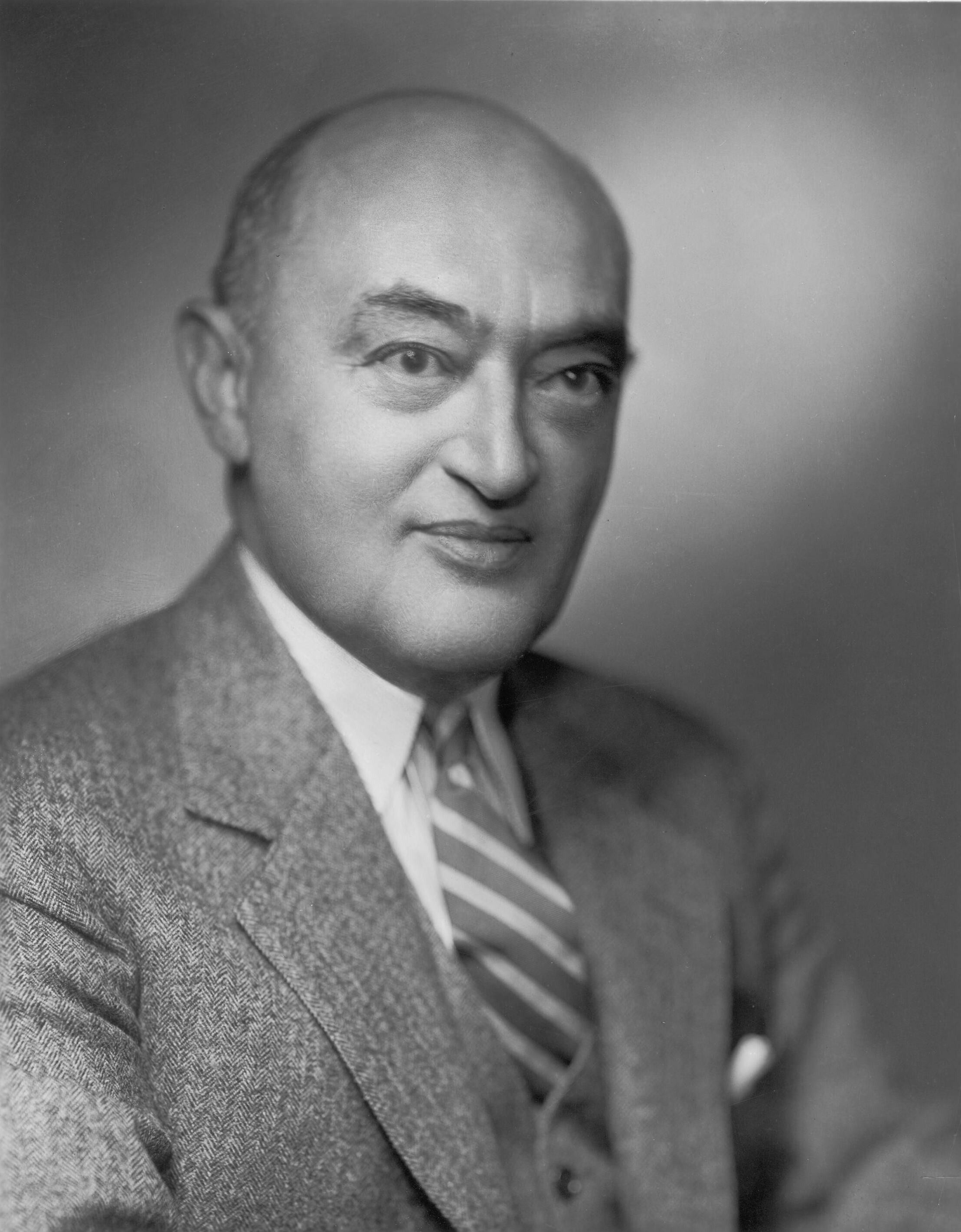
Joseph Schumpeter (1883–1950) is credited with coining the modern understanding of the term.

The expression "creative destruction" was popularized by and is most associated with Joseph Schumpeter, particularly in his book Capitalism, Socialism and Democracy, first published in 1942. Already in his 1939 book Business Cycles, he attempted to refine the innovative ideas of Nikolai Kondratieff and his long-wave cycle which Schumpeter believed was driven by technological innovation. Three years later, in Capitalism, Socialism and Democracy, Schumpeter introduced the term "creative destruction", which he explicitly derived from Marxist thought (analysed extensively in Part I of the book) and used it to describe the disruptive process of transformation that accompanies such innovation:

Capitalism ... is by nature a form or method of economic change and not only never is but never can be stationary. ... The fundamental impulse that sets and keeps the capitalist engine in motion comes from the new consumers' goods, the new methods of production or transportation, the new markets, the new forms of industrial organization that capitalist enterprise creates.

... The opening up of new markets, foreign or domestic, and the organizational development from the craft shop and factory to such concerns as U.S. Steel illustrate the process of industrial mutation that incessantly revolutionizes the economic structure from within, incessantly destroying the old one, incessantly creating a new one. This process of Creative Destruction is the essential fact about capitalism. It is what capitalism consists in and what every capitalist concern has got to live in.

[... Capitalism requires] the perennial gale of Creative Destruction.

In Schumpeter's vision of capitalism, innovative entry by entrepreneurs was the disruptive force that sustained economic growth, even as it destroyed the value of established companies and laborers that enjoyed some degree of monopoly power derived from previous technological, organizational, regulatory, and economic paradigms. However, Schumpeter was pessimistic about the sustainability of this process, seeing it as leading eventually to the undermining of capitalism's own institutional frameworks:

In breaking down the pre-capitalist framework of society, capitalism thus broke not only barriers that impeded its progress but also flying buttresses that prevented its collapse. That process, impressive in its relentless necessity, was not merely a matter of removing institutional deadwood, but of removing partners of the capitalist stratum, symbiosis with whom was an essential element of the capitalist schema. [... T]he capitalist process in much the same way in which it destroyed the institutional framework of feudal society also undermines its own.

=== Examples ===
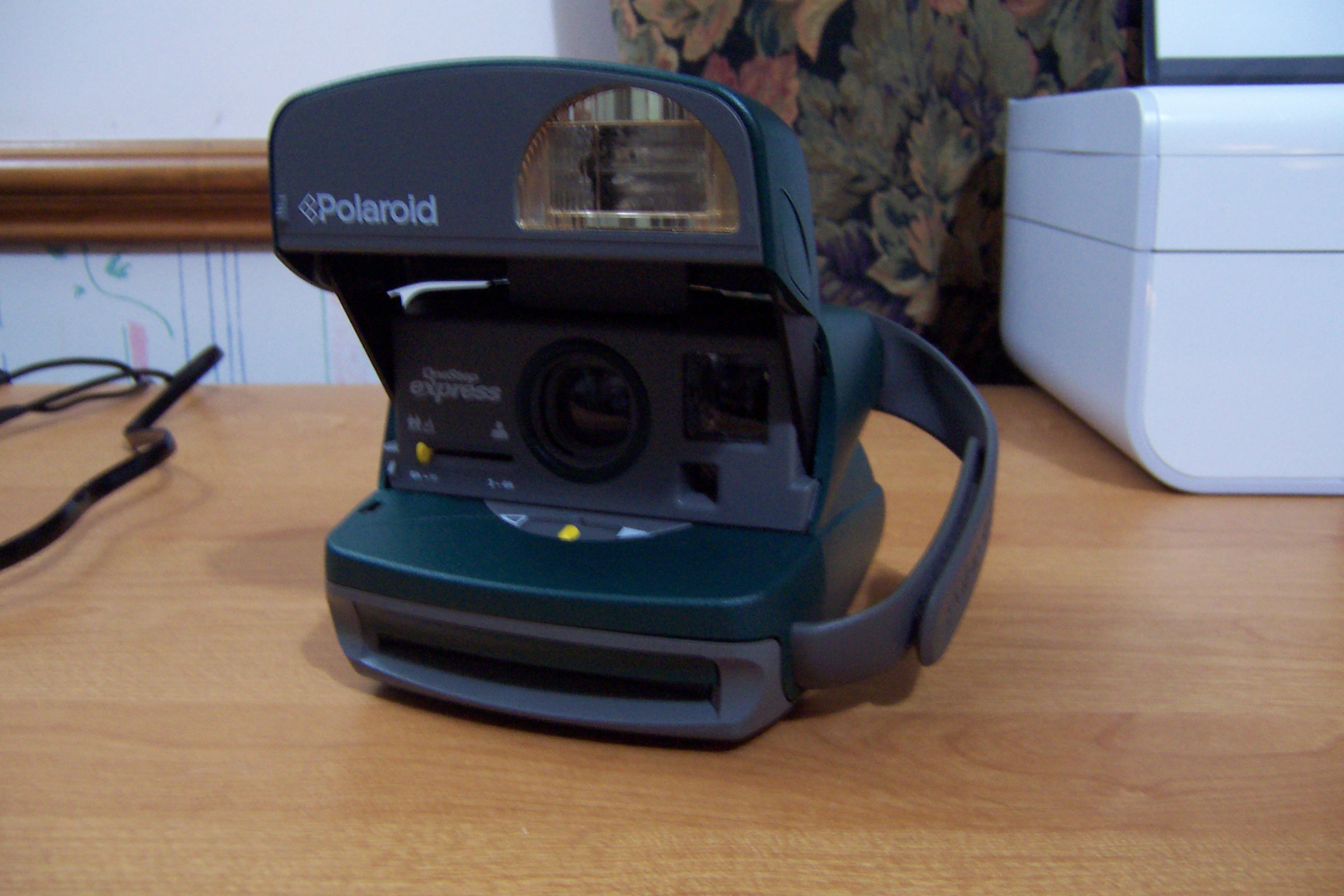
Polaroid instant cameras have disappeared almost completely with the spread of digital photography. They were only to return once again in 2017 with new cameras and films, as the demand for the instant photo was underestimated.

Schumpeter (1949) in one of his examples used "the railroadization of the Middle West as it was initiated by the Illinois Central". He wrote, "The Illinois Central not only meant very good business whilst it was built and whilst new cities were built around it and land was cultivated, but it spelled the death sentence for the [old] agriculture of the West".

Companies that once revolutionized and dominated new industries – for example, Xerox in copiers or Polaroid in instant photography – have seen their profits fall and their dominance vanish as rivals launched improved designs or cut manufacturing costs. In technology, the cassette tape replaced the 8-track, only to be replaced in turn by the compact disc, which was undercut by downloads to MP3 players, which is now being usurped by web-based streaming services. Companies that made money out of technology which eventually becomes obsolete do not necessarily adapt well to the business environment created by the new technologies.

One such example is how online ad-supported news sites such as The Huffington Post are leading to creative destruction of the traditional newspaper. The Christian Science Monitor announced in January 2009 that it would no longer continue to publish a daily paper edition, but would be available online daily and provide a weekly print edition. The Seattle Post-Intelligencer became online-only in March 2009. At a national level in USA, employment in the newspaper business fell from 455,700 in 1990 to 225,100 in 2013. Over that same period, employment in internet publishing and broadcasting grew from 29,400 to 121,200. Traditional French alumni networks, which typically charge their students to network online or through paper directories, are in danger of creative destruction from free social networking sites such as LinkedIn and Viadeo.

In fact, successful innovation is normally a source of temporary market power, eroding the profits and position of old firms, yet ultimately succumbing to the pressure of new inventions commercialised by competing entrants. Creative destruction is a powerful economic concept because it can explain many of the dynamics or kinetics of industrial change: the transition from a competitive to a monopolistic market, and back again. It has been the inspiration of endogenous growth theory and also of evolutionary economics.

David Ames Wells (1890), who was a leading authority on the effects of technology on the economy in the late 19th century, gave many examples of creative destruction (without using the term) brought about by improvements in steam engine efficiency, shipping, the international telegraph network, and agricultural mechanization.

== Later developments ==
=== Ludwig Lachmann ===
These economic facts have certain social consequences. As the critics of the market economy nowadays prefer to take their stand on "social" grounds, it may be not inappropriate here to elucidate the true social results of the market process. We have already spoken of it as a leveling process. More aptly, we may now describe these results as an instance of what Pareto called "the circulation of elites". Wealth is unlikely to stay for long in the same hands. It passes from hand to hand as unforeseen change confers value, now on this, now on that specific resource, engendering capital gains and losses. The owners of wealth, we might say with Schumpeter, are like the guests at a hotel or the passengers in a train: They are always there but are never for long the same people.

— Ludwig Lachmann, The Market Economy and the Distribution of Wealth

=== David Harvey ===
Geographer and historian David Harvey in a series of works from the 1970s onwards (Social Justice and the City, 1973; The Limits to Capital, 1982; The Urbanization of Capital, 1985; Spaces of Hope, 2000; Spaces of Capital, 2001; Spaces of Neoliberalization, 2005; The Enigma of Capital and the Crises of Capitalism, 2010), elaborated Marx's thought on the systemic contradictions of capitalism, particularly in relation to the production of the urban environment (and to the production of space more broadly). He developed the notion that capitalism finds a "spatial fix" for its periodic crises of overaccumulation through investment in fixed assets of infrastructure, buildings, etc.: "The built environment that constitutes a vast field of collective means of production and consumption absorbs huge amounts of capital in both its construction and its maintenance. Urbanization is one way to absorb the capital surplus". While the creation of the built environment can act as a form of crisis displacement, it can also constitute a limit in its own right, as it tends to freeze productive forces into a fixed spatial form. As capital cannot abide a limit to profitability, ever more frantic forms of "time-space compression" (increased speed of turnover, innovation of ever faster transport and communications' infrastructure, "flexible accumulation") ensue, often impelling technological innovation. Such innovation, however, is a double-edged sword:

The effect of continuous innovation ... is to devalue, if not destroy, past investments and labour skills. Creative destruction is embedded within the circulation of capital itself. Innovation exacerbates instability, insecurity, and in the end, becomes the prime force pushing capitalism into periodic paroxysms of crisis. ... The struggle to maintain profitability sends capitalists racing off to explore all kinds of other possibilities. New product lines are opened up, and that means the creation of new wants and needs. Capitalists are forced to redouble their efforts to create new needs in others .... The result is to exacerbate insecurity and instability, as masses of capital and workers shift from one line of production to another, leaving whole sectors devastated .... The drive to relocate to more advantageous places (the geographical movement of both capital and labour) periodically revolutionizes the international and territorial division of labour, adding a vital geographical dimension to the insecurity. The resultant transformation in the experience of space and place is matched by revolutions in the time dimension, as capitalists strive to reduce the turnover time of their capital to "the twinkling of an eye".

Globalization can be viewed as some ultimate form of time-space compression, allowing capital investment to move almost instantaneously from one corner of the globe to another, devaluing fixed assets and laying off labour in one urban conglomeration while opening up new centres of manufacture in more profitable sites for production operations. Hence, in this continual process of creative destruction, capitalism does not resolve its contradictions and crises, but merely "moves them around geographically".

=== Marshall Berman ===
In his 1987 book All That is Solid Melts into Air: The Experience of Modernity, particularly in the chapter entitled "Innovative Self-Destruction" (pp. 98–104), Marshall Berman provides a reading of Marxist "creative destruction" to explain key processes at work within modernity. The title of the book is taken from a well-known passage from The Communist Manifesto. Berman elaborates this into something of a Zeitgeist which has profound social and cultural consequences:

The truth of the matter, as Marx sees, is that everything that bourgeois society builds is built to be torn down. "All that is solid"—from the clothes on our backs to the looms and mills that weave them, to the men and women who work the machines, to the houses and neighborhoods the workers live in, to the firms and corporations that exploit the workers, to the towns and cities and whole regions and even nations that embrace them all—all these are made to be broken tomorrow, smashed or shredded or pulverized or dissolved, so they can be recycled or replaced next week, and the whole process can go on again and again, hopefully forever, in ever more profitable forms. The pathos of all bourgeois monuments is that their material strength and solidity actually count for nothing and carry no weight at all, that they are blown away like frail reeds by the very forces of capitalist development that they celebrate. Even the most beautiful and impressive bourgeois buildings and public works are disposable, capitalized for fast depreciation and planned to be obsolete, closer in their social functions to tents and encampments than to "Egyptian pyramids, Roman aqueducts, Gothic cathedrals".

Here Berman emphasizes Marx's perception of the fragility and evanescence of capitalism's immense creative forces, and makes this apparent contradiction into one of the key explanatory figures of modernity.

In 2021, Berman's younger son applied the elder's conception of creative destruction to the field of art history, writing in Hunter College's graduate art history journal. The essay reconsiders the modern media of photography, photomontage, and collage through the lens of "creative destruction". In doing so, the younger Berman attempts to show that in certain works of art of the above-mentioned media, referents (such as nature, real people, other works of art, newspaper clippings, etc.) can be given new and unique significance even while necessarily being obscured by the very nature of their presentation.

=== Manuel Castells ===
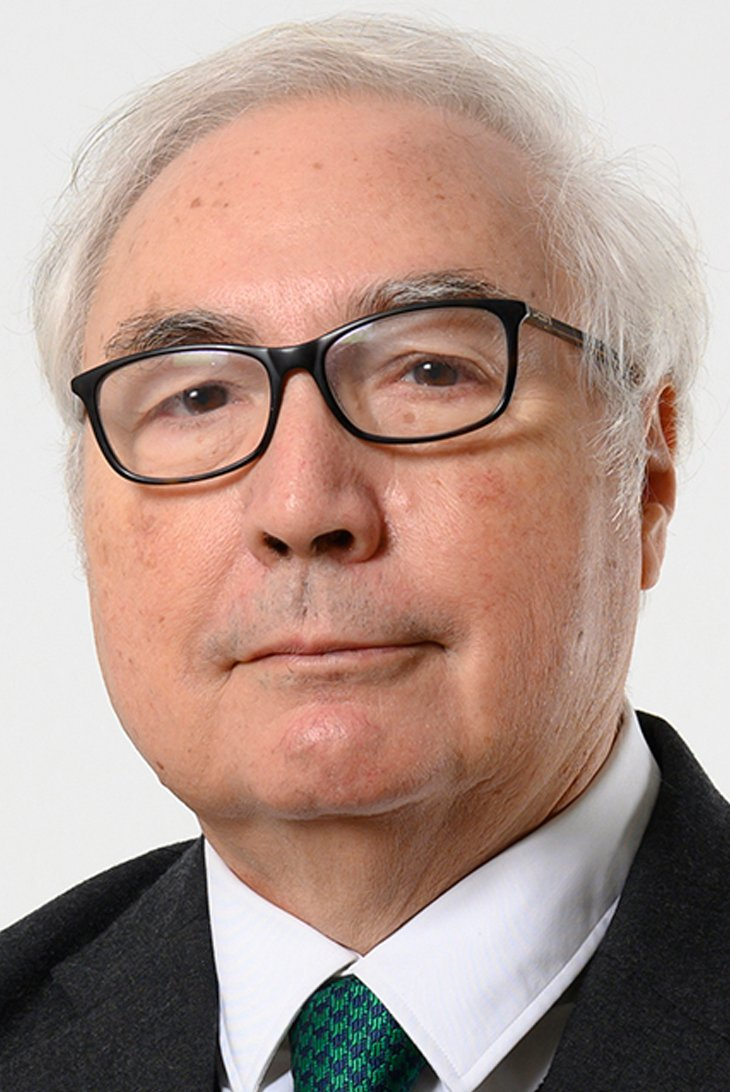
Manuel Castells in 2020

The sociologist Manuel Castells, in his trilogy on The Information Age: Economy, Society and Culture (the first volume of which, The Rise of the Network Society, appeared in 1996), reinterpreted the processes by which capitalism invests in certain regions of the globe, while divesting from others, using the new paradigm of "informational networks". In the era of globalization, capitalism is characterized by near-instantaneous flow, creating a new spatial dimension, "the space of flows". While technological innovation has enabled this unprecedented fluidity, this very process makes redundant whole areas and populations who are bypassed by informational networks. Indeed, the new spatial form of the mega-city or megalopolis, is defined by Castells as having the contradictory quality of being "globally connected and locally disconnected, physically and socially". Castells explicitly links these arguments to the notion of creative destruction:

The "spirit of informationalism" is the culture of "creative destruction" accelerated to the speed of the optoelectronic circuits that process its signals. Schumpeter meets Weber in the cyberspace of the network enterprise.

=== Daniele Archibugi ===
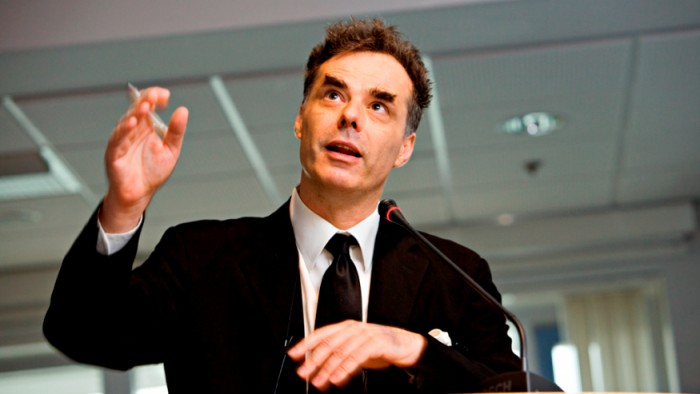
Daniele Archibugi in 2006

Developing the Schumpeterian legacy, the school of the Science Policy Research Unit of the University of Sussex further detailed the importance of creative destruction. In particular, new technologies are often incompatible with the existing productive regimes and will bankrupt companies and even industries that change too slowly. Chris Freeman and Carlota Perez developed these insights. More recently, Daniele Archibugi and Andrea Filippetti associated the 2008 economic crisis with the slow-down of opportunities offered by information and communication technologies (ICTs). Archibugi used the 1982 film Blade Runner as a metaphor to argue that of the innovations shown, all those associated with ICTs have become part of everyday life. However, none in the field of biotechnology have been fully commercialized. A new economic recovery will occur when some key technological opportunities are identified and sustained.

Technological opportunities do not enter into economic and social life without deliberate efforts and choices. We should be able to envisage new forms of organization associated with emerging technology. ICTs have already changed our lifestyle even more than our economic life: they have generated jobs and profits, but above all they have transformed the way we use our time and interact with the world. Biotech could bring about even more radical social transformations at the core of our life. Why have these not yet been delivered? What can be done to unleash their potential? There are a few basic questions that need to be addressed.

=== Others ===
In 1992, the idea of creative destruction was put into formal mathematical terms by Philippe Aghion and Peter Howitt, giving an alternative model of endogenous growth compared to Paul Romer's expanding varieties model. For their work, they were awarded with the Nobel Prize in Economic Sciences in 2025.

In 1995, Harvard Business School authors Richard L. Nolan and David C. Croson released a book advocating downsizing to free up slack resources, which could then be reinvested to create competitive advantage.

The idea of "creative destruction" was utilized by Max Page in his 1999 book, The Creative Destruction of Manhattan, 1900–1940. The book traces Manhattan's constant reinvention, often at the expense of preserving a concrete past. Describing this process as "creative destruction". Page describes the complex historical circumstances, economics, social conditions and personalities that have produced crucial changes in Manhattan's cityscape.

In addition to Max Page, others have used the term "creative destruction" to describe the process of urban renewal and modernization. T.C. Chang and Shirlena Huang referenced "creative destruction" in their paper Recreating place, replacing memory: Creative Destruction at the Singapore River. The authors explored the efforts to redevelop a waterfront area that reflected a vibrant new culture while paying sufficient homage to the history of the region. Rosemary Wakeman chronicled the evolution of an area in central Paris, France known as Les Halles. Les Halles housed a vibrant marketplace starting in the twelfth century. Ultimately, in 1971, the markets were relocated and the pavilions torn down. In their place, now stand a hub for trains, subways and buses. Les Halles is also the site of the largest shopping mall in France and the controversial Centre Georges Pompidou.

The term "creative destruction" has been applied to the arts. Alan Ackerman and Martin Puncher (2006) edited a collection of essays under the title Against Theater: Creative destruction on the modernist stage. They detail the changes and the causal motivations experienced in theater as a result of the modernization of both the production of performances and the underlying economics. They speak of how theater has reinvented itself in the face of anti-theatricality, straining the boundaries of the traditional to include more physical productions, which might be considered avant-garde staging techniques.

Additionally within art, Tyler Cowen's book Creative Destruction describes how art styles change as artists are simply exposed to outside ideas and styles, even if they do not intend to incorporate those influences into their art. Traditional styles may give way to new styles, and thus creative destruction allows for more diversified art, especially when cultures share their art with each other.

In his 1999 book, Still the New World, American Literature in a Culture of Creative Destruction, Philip Fisher analyzes the themes of creative destruction at play in literary works of the twentieth century, including the works of such authors as Ralph Waldo Emerson, Walt Whitman, Herman Melville, Mark Twain, and Henry James, among others. Fisher argues that creative destruction exists within literary forms just as it does within the changing of technology.

Neoconservative author Michael Ledeen argued in his 2002 book The War Against the Terror Masters that America is a revolutionary nation, undoing traditional societies: "Creative destruction is our middle name, both within our own society and abroad. We tear down the old order every day, from business to science, literature, art, architecture, and cinema to politics and the law". His characterization of creative destruction as a model for social development has met with fierce opposition from paleoconservatives.

Creative destruction has also been linked to sustainable development. The connection was explicitly mentioned for the first time by Stuart L. Hart and Mark B. Milstein in their 1999 article Global Sustainability and the Creative Destruction of Industries, in which he argues new profit opportunities lie in a round of creative destruction driven by global sustainability. (They would strengthen this argument later in their 2003 article Creating Sustainable Value and, in 2005, with Innovation, Creative Destruction and Sustainability.) Andrea L. Larson agreed with this vision a year later in Sustainable Innovation Through an Entrepreneurship Lens, stating entrepreneurs should be open to the opportunities for disruptive improvement based on sustainability. In 2005, James Hartshorn (et al.) emphasized the opportunities for sustainable, disruptive improvement in the construction industry in his article Creative Destruction: Building Toward Sustainability.

Some economists argue that the destructive component of creative destruction has become more powerful than it was in the past. They claim that the creative component does not add as much to growth as in earlier generations, and innovation has become more rent-seeking than value-creating.

== Alternative name ==
The following text appears to be the source of the phrase "Schumpeter's Gale" to refer to creative destruction:

The opening up of new markets and the organizational development from the craft shop and factory to such concerns as US Steel illustrate the process of industrial mutation that incessantly revolutionizes the economic structure from within, incessantly destroying the old one, incessantly creating a new one ... [The process] must be seen in its role in the perennial gale of creative destruction; it cannot be understood on the hypothesis that there is a perennial lull.

— Joseph Schumpeter, Capitalism, Socialism and Democracy, 1942

== Impediments ==
Politicians often impose impediments to the forces of creative destruction by regulating entry and exit rules that make it difficult for churning to take place. In a series of papers Andrei Shleifer and Simeon Djankov illustrate the effects of such regulation on slowing down competition and innovation.

In building economic resilience against black swan events by means of systemic policy, Federal Reserve researchers warned in May 2025 against conflating creative destruction with a black swan, stating "[s]ystemic policies do not prevent the harms that can arise from routine events such as firm bankruptcies, financial institution failures, and job losses as part of traditional Schumpeterian creative-destruction dynamics. Instead, systemic policies enable the key functions of the financial system to persist during periods of severe distress".

== In popular culture ==
The film Other People's Money (1991) provides contrasting views of creative destruction, presented in two speeches regarding the takeover of a publicly traded wire and cable company in a small New England town. One speech is by a corporate raider, and the other is given by the company CEO, who is principally interested in protecting his employees and the town.

== See also ==
- Accelerationism
- Creativity techniques
- Disruptive innovation
- Extinction event
- International Innovation Index
- Parable of the broken window
- Product lifecycle
- Pseudowork
- Schumpeterian rent
