= Yves Balasko =

French economist

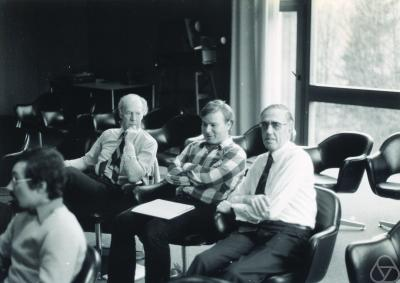
- Gérard Debreu, Yves Balasko and Edmond Malinvaud at Oberwolfach, circa 1977
- Born: 9 August 1945 (age 81); Paris, France

Academic background
- Education: Paris Dauphine University; École Normale Supérieure
- Doctoral advisor: Jean-Pierre Aubin

Academic work
- Doctoral students: Philippe Aghion

Yves Balasko is a French economist working in England. He was born in Paris on 9 August 1945 to a Hungarian father and a French mother. After studying mathematics at the École Normale Supérieure in Paris he became interested in economics. He subsequently spent six years at Électricité de France where he was involved in the application of the theory of marginal cost pricing to electricity pricing. While at Électricité de France, he proved his first results on the structure of the equilibrium manifold in the theory of general equilibrium. After completing his dissertation on "L'équilibre économique du point de vue differentiel" (English: "The Economic equilibrium from the differential point of view"), he had positions at the Universities of Paris XII, Paris I, Geneva and York. In 2013, he held a visiting scholar position at Pontifical Catholic University of Rio de Janeiro, in Brazil. Since 2014, he has returned to York University.

He is a Fellow of the Econometric Society since 1980. He is also a Vice President of the Society for Economic Measurement (SEM).

In mathematical economics, Balasko has worked on general equilibrium theory, the overlapping generations model and the theory of incomplete asset markets. In his research, Balasko uses topology.

== Books ==
- Foundations of the Theory of General Equilibrium, 1988, ISBN 0-12-076975-1.
- The Equilibrium Manifold: Postmodern Developments in the Theory of General Economic Equilibrium, 2009, ISBN 978-0-262-02654-3
- General Equilibrium Theory of Value, 2011, ISBN 978-0-691-14679-9
