= Peter Howitt =

Peter Howitt may refer to:

- Peter Howitt (actor) (born 1957), actor and director of Johnny English, Laws of Attraction and other movies
- Peter Howitt (economist) (born 1946), winner of the 2025 Nobel Memorial Prize in Economic Sciences
- Peter Howitt (set decorator) (1928–2021), nominated for four Academy Awards in the category Best Art Direction

== See also ==
- Peter Hewitt (disambiguation)
