= Peter Hewitt =

Peter Hewitt may refer to:

- Peter Hewitt (businessman) (born 1953), English business and civic figure
- Peter Hewitt (director) (born 1962), English film director
- Peter Cooper Hewitt (1861–1921), American engineer

== See also ==
- Peter Howitt (disambiguation)
