= James A. Robinson =

British political scientist and economist (born 1960)

James Robinson
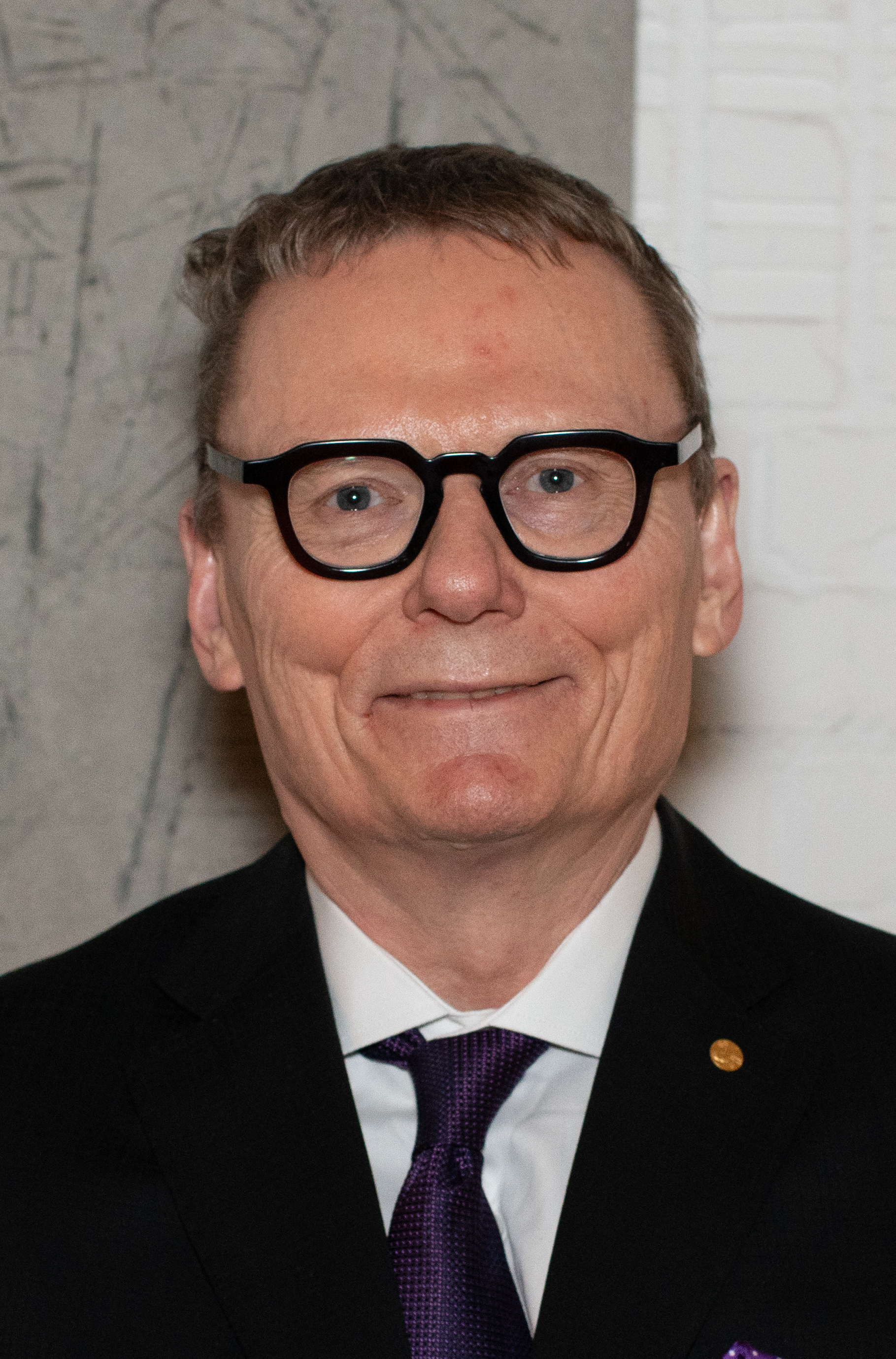
- Robinson at 2024 Nobel Week
- Born: James Alan Robinson; February 27, 1960 (age 66); Chelmsford, England, UK
- Citizenship: United Kingdom; United States
- Awards: Nobel Memorial Prize in Economic Sciences (2024)

Academic background
- Education: London School of Economics (BSc); University of Warwick (MA); Yale University (PhD)
- Thesis: The Dynamic Enforcement of Implicit Labor Contracts under Asymmetric Information (1993)
- Doctoral advisor: Truman Bewley

Academic work
- Discipline: Economics
- Sub-discipline: Economic theory; Labor relations
- Institutions: University of Chicago; Harvard University; University of California, Berkeley; University of Southern California; University of Melbourne

James Alan Robinson (born 27 February 1960, Chelmsford) is a British-American economist and political scientist. He is a university professor at the Harris School of Public Policy of the University of Chicago, where he led the Pearson Institute for the Study and Resolution of Global Conflicts. Robinson taught at Harvard University from 2004 to 2015.

With Daron Acemoglu, he is the co-author of several books, including The Narrow Corridor, Why Nations Fail, and Economic Origins of Dictatorship and Democracy. In 2024, Robinson, Acemoglu, and Simon Johnson were awarded the Nobel Memorial Prize in Economic Sciences for their comparative studies on prosperity between nations.

== Education ==
Robinson received a Bachelor of Science in economics from the London School of Economics and Political Science in 1982, a Master of Arts in economics from the University of Warwick in 1986, and a Doctor of Philosophy in economics from Yale University in 1993.

== Career ==
Robinson's main fields of research are in political economy and comparative politics, as well as in economic and political development.

In 2004, Robinson was appointed Associate Professor of Government at Harvard University. He later held named chair positions at Harvard, first as the David Florence Professor of Government (2009–2014) and later as the Wilbur A. Cowett Professor of Government (2014–2015). On 1 July 2015, he was appointed as one of nine University Professors at the Harris School of Public Policy Studies of the University of Chicago. He previously held the title Reverend Dr. Richard L. Pearson Professor of Global Conflict Studies. On 9 May 2016, Professor Robinson was awarded an honorary doctorate by the National University of Mongolia during his first visit to the country.

He has conducted research in countries around the world including Botswana, Chile, the Democratic Republic of the Congo, Haiti, the Philippines, Sierra Leone, South Africa and Colombia, where he teaches every summer at the University of the Andes in Bogotá.

On 17 March 2023, James Robinson met with students, scientists, leaders of social opinion, and representatives of finance, economy, and business circles in Tashkent, Uzbekistan. In an interview, Robinson discussed the construction of inclusive institutions in authoritarian countries, the challenging development of countries post-colonialism, the "mistakes" made consciously, and answered questions regarding the "King of Cotton" section on Uzbekistan in his book Why Nations Fail.

He has collaborated extensively with long-time co-author Daron Acemoglu after meeting at the London School of Economics.

== Research ==
=== Economic Origins of Dictatorship and Democracy ===
Economic Origins of Dictatorship and Democracy (2006), co-authored by Robinson with Daron Acemoglu analyzes the creation and consolidation of democratic societies. They argue that "democracy consolidates when elites do not have a strong incentive to overthrow it. These processes depend on (1) the strength of civil society, (2) the structure of political institutions, (3) the nature of political and economic crises, (4) the level of economic inequality, (5) the structure of the economy, and (6) the form and extent of globalization." The book's title is derived from Social Origins of Dictatorship and Democracy, a 1966 book by Barrington Moore Jr.

=== Why Nations Fail ===
In Why Nations Fail: The Origins of Power, Prosperity, and Poverty (2012), Acemoglu and Robinson argue that economic growth at the forefront of technology requires political stability, which the Mayan civilization (to name only one) did not have, and creative destruction. The latter cannot occur without institutional restraints on the granting of monopoly and oligopoly rights. They say that the Industrial Revolution began in Great Britain, because the English Bill of Rights 1689 created such restraints. For example, a steamboat built in 1705 by Denis Papin was demolished by a boatmen guild in Münden, Germany. Papin went to London, where several of his papers were published by the Royal Society. Thomas Newcomen extended Papin's work into a steam engines in 1712, and became a commercial success, while Papin died in 1713 and was buried in an unmarked pauper's grave.

Acemoglu and Robinson insist that "development differences across countries are exclusively due to differences in political and economic institutions, and reject other theories that attribute some of the differences to culture, weather, geography or lack of knowledge about the best policies and practices." For example, "Soviet Russia generated rapid growth as it caught up rapidly with some of the advanced technologies in the world [but] was running out of steam by the 1970s" because of a lack of creative destruction.

=== The Narrow Corridor ===
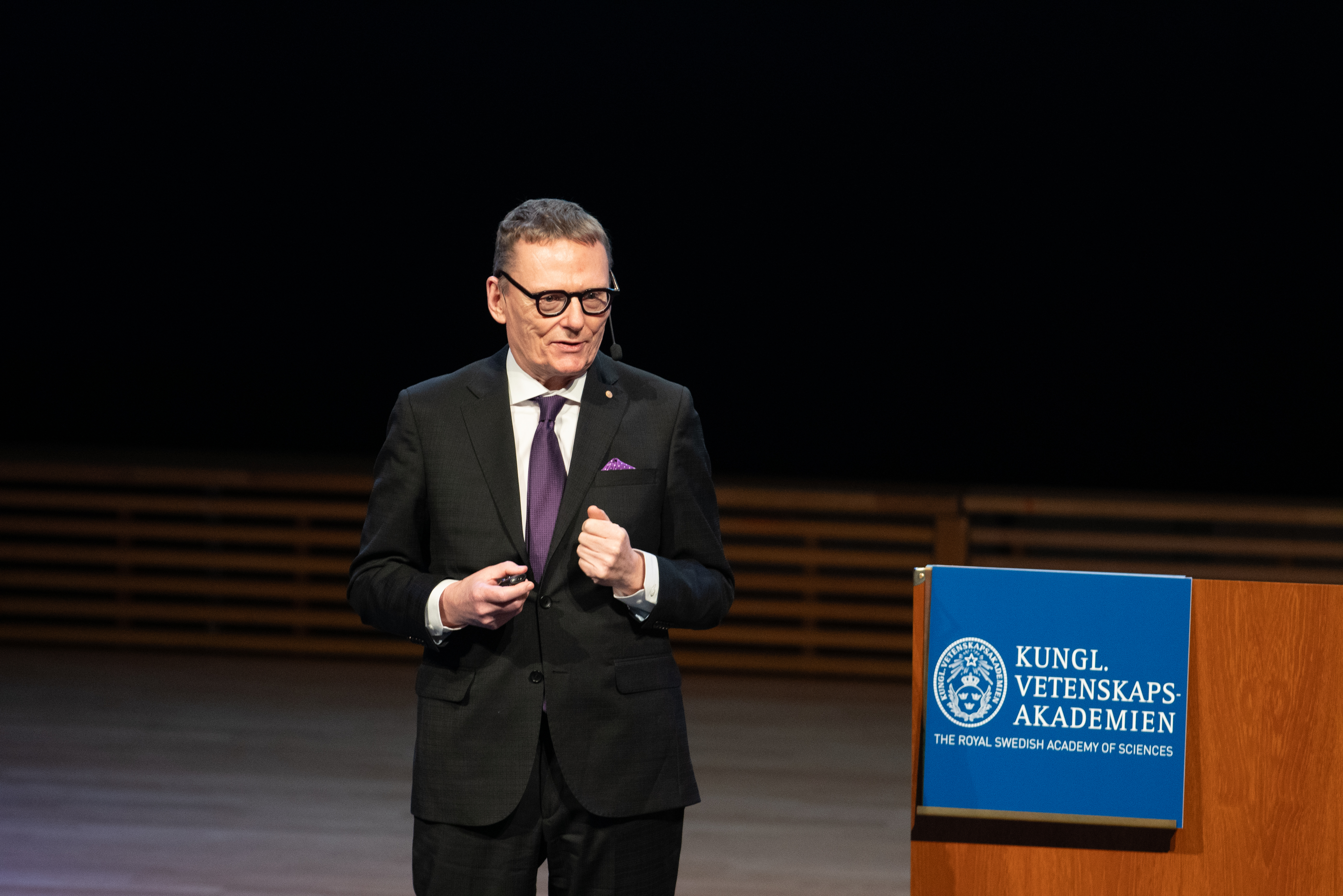
Robinson lecturing at 2024 Nobel Week

In The Narrow Corridor. States, Societies, and the Fate of Liberty (2019), Acemoglu and Robinson argue that a free society is attained when the power of the state and of society have evolved in rough balance.

=== A critique of modernization theory ===
Daron Acemoglu and James A. Robinson, in their article "Income and Democracy" (2008) show that even though there is a strong cross-country correlation between income and democracy, once one controls for country fixed effects and removes the association between income per capita and various measures of democracy, there is "no causal effect of income on democracy." In "Non-Modernization" (2022), they further argue that modernization theory cannot account for various paths of political development "because it posits a link between economics and politics that is not conditional on institutions and culture and that presumes a definite endpoint—for example, an 'end of history'."

== Publications ==
=== Books ===
- James A. Robinson; Daron Acemoglu (2019). The Narrow Corridor: States, Societies, and the Fate of Liberty. New York: Penguin Press. ISBN 978-0735224384.
- James A. Robinson; Emmanuel Akyeampong; Robert H. Bates; Nathan Nunn, eds. (2014). Africa's Development in Historical Perspective. New York: Cambridge University Press. ISBN 978-1107691209.
- James A. Robinson; Alice H. Amsden; Alisa DiCaprio, eds. (2012). The Role of Elites in Economic Development. New York: Oxford University Press. ISBN 978-0-19-965903-6.
- James A. Robinson; Daron Acemoglu (2012). Why Nations Fail: The Origins of Power, Prosperity and Poverty. New York: Crown Business. ISBN 978-0307719218.
- James A. Robinson; Jared Diamond, eds. (2010). Natural Experiments of History. Cambridge, MA: Harvard University Press. ISBN 978-0-674-03557-7.
- James A. Robinson; Klaus Wiegandt, eds. (2008). Die Ursprünge der modernen Welt: Geschichte im wissenschaftlichen Vergleich (in German). Frankfurt: Fischer Taschenbuch Verlag. ISBN 978-3596179343.
- James A. Robinson; Miguel Urrutia, eds. (2007). Economía Colombiana del Siglo XX: Un Análisis Cuantitativo (in Spanish). Bogotá and México D.F.: Fondo de Cultura Económica. ISBN 978-9583801396.
- James A. Robinson; Daron Acemoglu (2006). Economic Origins of Dictatorship and Democracy. Cambridge, UK: Cambridge University Press. ISBN 0-521-67142-6.

=== Articles ===
- Acemoglu, Daron, Simon Johnson, and James Robinson. 2001. "The Colonial Origins of Comparative Development: An Empirical Investigation." American Economic Review Vol. 91, Nº 5: 1369–401.
- Robinson, James A. 2006. "Economic Development and Democracy." Annual Reviews of Political Science 9, 503–527.
- Acemoglu, Daron, Simon Johnson, James A. Robinson, and Pierre Yared. 2008. "Income and Democracy." American Economic Review 98(3): 808–42.
- Acemoglu, Daron, Simon Johnson, James A. Robinson, and Pierre Yared. 2009 "Reevaluating the Modernization Hypothesis." Journal of Monetary Economics 56(8): 1043–58.
- Acemoglu, Daron and James Robinson. 2022. "Non-Modernization: Power–Culture Trajectories and the Dynamics of Political Institutions." Annual Review of Political Science 25(1): 323–339

== See also ==
- Critical juncture theory – Theory of large, discontinuous changes
- Economic history
- Environmental determinism – Theory that a society's development is predetermined by its physical environment
- Institutional economics – Economics that focuses on institutions
- New institutional economics – Economic perspective
- Colonial Origins of Comparative Development
