= Peter Howitt (economist) =

Canadian economist (born 1946)

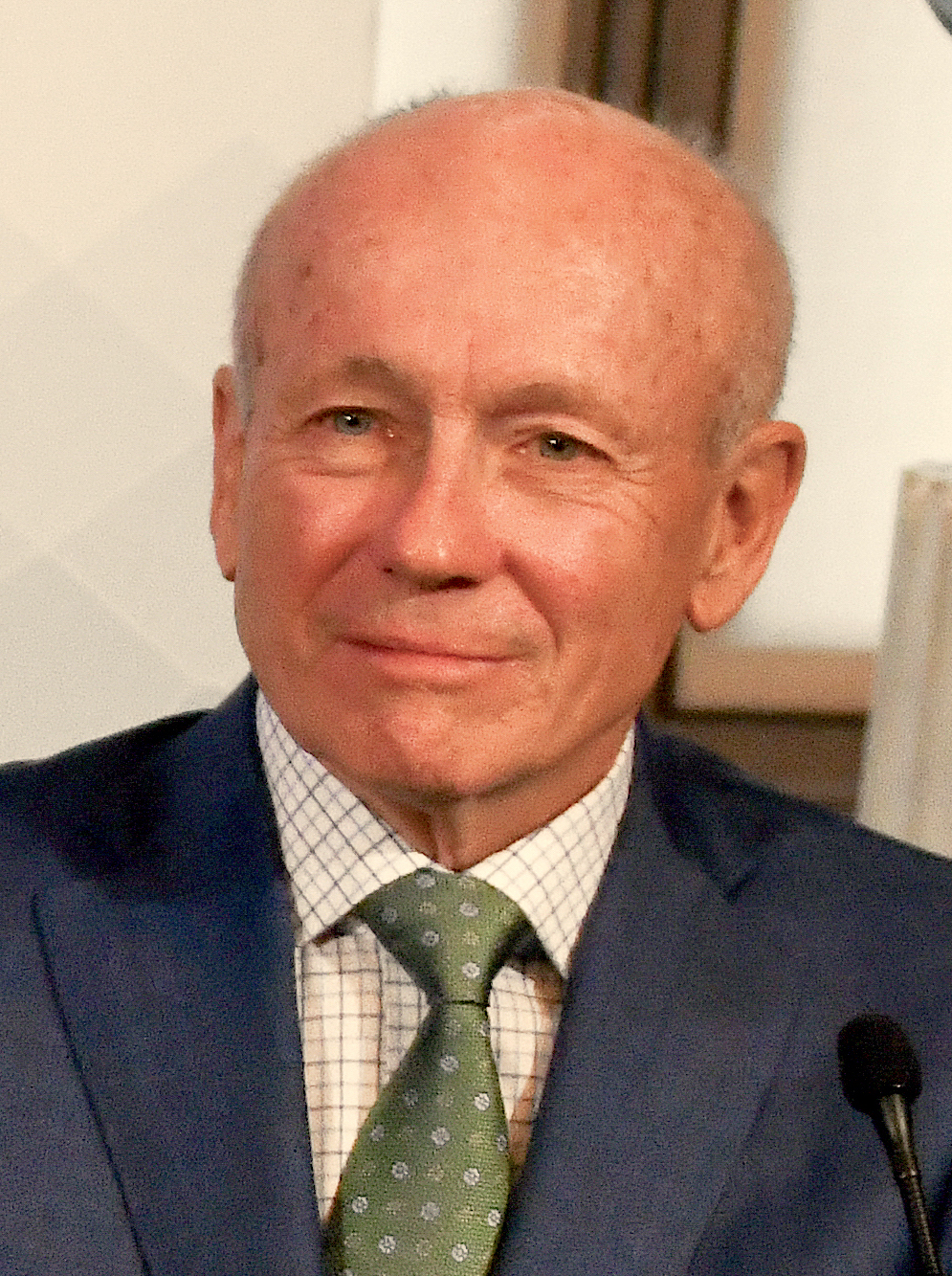
- Born: Peter Wilkinson Howitt; May 31, 1946 (age 80); Guelph, Ontario, Canada
- Known for: Aghion–Howitt model Endogenous growth theory Creative destruction

Academic background
- Education: McGill University (BA); University of Western Ontario (MA); Northwestern University (PhD)
- Thesis: Studies in the Theory of Monetary Dynamics (1973)
- Doctoral advisor: Robert W. Clower

Academic work
- Discipline: Economic growth Macroeconomics; Monetary economics
- School or tradition: Neo-Schumpeterian economics
- Institutions: University of Western Ontario; Ohio State University; Brown University
- Doctoral students: Roger Farmer; Martín Guzmán
- Awards: Nobel Memorial Prize in Economic Sciences (2025)
- Website: vivo.brown.edu/display/phowitt

Peter Wilkinson Howitt (born May 31, 1946) is a Canadian economist and the Lyn Crost Professor of Social Sciences Emeritus at Brown University. He is best known for his collaborative work with Philippe Aghion on endogenous growth theory, the concept of creative destruction in modern macroeconomics and the Aghion–Howitt model. In 2025, Howitt and Aghion were jointly awarded the Nobel Memorial Prize in Economic Sciences "for the theory of sustained growth through creative destruction."

== Early life and education ==
Howitt was born in Guelph, Ontario, in 1946. He earned his BA in economics from McGill University in 1968, his MA from the University of Western Ontario in 1969, and his PhD from Northwestern University in 1973 under Robert W. Clower.

== Academic career ==
Howitt returned to Canada after receiving his PhD and taught at the University of Western Ontario from 1972 to 1996. He became a faculty member at the Ohio State University in 1996 and joined Brown University in 2000, where he has remained since. Since 2013, Howitt is Professor Emeritus at Brown University. Besides his university affiliations, he also has long-time connections with the C. D. Howe Institute, a nonpartisan think tank based in Toronto, Canada. Howitt started publishing reports of economic policy through the institute since 1986 and was a fellow-in-residence from 2011 to 2015.

He served as president of the Canadian Economics Association in 1993–1994 and was the editor of the Journal of Money, Credit, and Banking in the period 1997–2000.

== Honours and awards ==
Howitt was elected a Fellow of the Royal Society of Canada in 1992 and of the Econometric Society in 1994. In 2019, he and Aghion received the BBVA Foundation Frontiers of Knowledge Award in Economics, Finance and Management. Howitt and Aghion were also awarded half of the Nobel Memorial Prize in Economic Sciences in 2025 "for the theory of sustained growth through creative destruction", the other half going to Joel Mokyr.

== Personal life ==
Howitt is married to Pat Howitt who he credits for encouraging and supporting the collaboration with Aghion.

== Selected works ==
- Howitt, Peter (1990). The Keynesian Recovery and Other Essays. Philip Allan. ISBN 978-0-86003-081-2.
- Howitt, Peter, ed. (1996). The Implications of Knowledge-Based Growth for Micro-Economic Policies. University of Calgary Press. ISBN 978-1-895176-78-0.
- Aghion, Philippe; Howitt, Peter (1998). Endogenous Growth Theory. MIT Press. ISBN 9780262011662.
- Howitt, Peter; De Antoni, Elisabetta; Leijonhufvud, Axel, eds. (1999). Money, Markets and Method: Essays in Honour of Robert W. Clower. Edward Elgar. ISBN 978-1-85898-901-3.
- Aghion, Philippe; Howitt, Peter (2008). The Economics of Growth. MIT Press. ISBN 978-0-262-30389-7.

== See also ==
Peter Howitt (disambiguation)
