= Philippe Aghion =

French economist (born 1956)

Phillipe Aghion
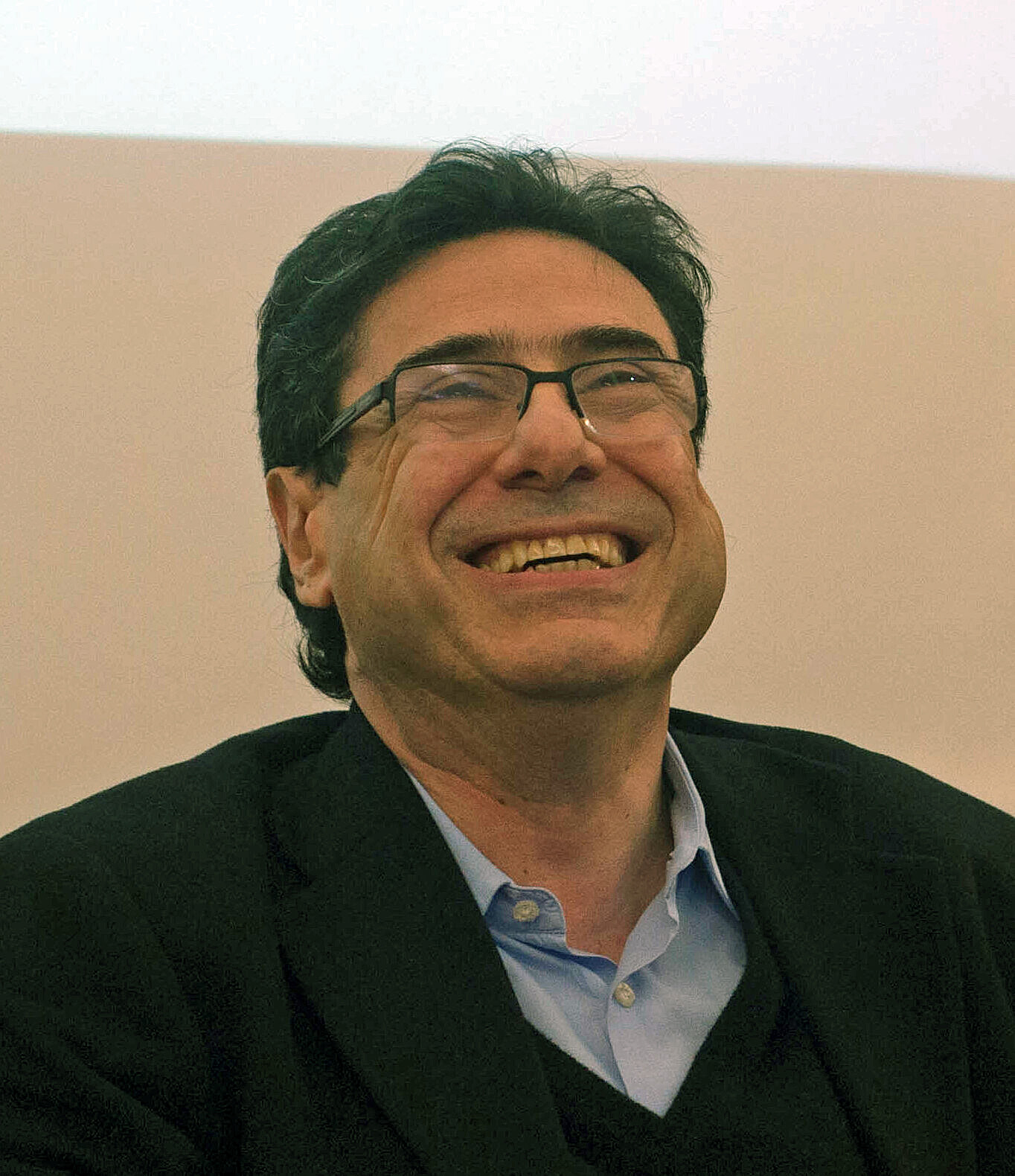
- Aghion at Boston University in February 2015
- Born: Philippe Mario Aghion; 17 August 1956 (age 70); Paris, France
- Known for: Aghion–Howitt model Endogenous growth theory Creative destruction
- Relatives: Gaby Aghion (mother)

Academic background
- Education: École normale supérieure de Cachan (BA); Paris 1 Panthéon-Sorbonne University (DEA, D3C); Harvard University (PhD)
- Thesis: Equilibres de marché, concurrence, et formation des prix (1983); Three Essays in the Theory of Industrial Organization (1987)
- Doctoral advisor: Yves Balasko; Jerry Green and Eric Maskin

Academic work
- Discipline: Innovation; Economic growth Organisations; Contract theory
- School or tradition: Neo-Schumpeterian economics
- Institutions: Collège de France; INSEAD; London School of Economics; Harvard University; University College London; Nuffield College, Oxford; Massachusetts Institute of Technology
- Doctoral students: Stephen Redding; Richard Holden; Nicola Lacetera; Leonardo Bursztyn
- Awards: BBVA Foundation Frontiers of Knowledge Award (2019); Nobel Prize in Economic Sciences (2025)

Philippe Mario Aghion FBA (French: [filip aɡjɔ̃]; born 17 August 1956) is a French economist who is Chair of Economics of Institutions, Innovation and Growth professor at the Collège de France, Kurt Björklund Chaired Professor in Innovation and Growth at INSEAD, and Visiting Professor of Economics at the London School of Economics.

Aghion and Peter Howitt are known for the Aghion–Howitt model. For this work, they shared half of the 2025 Nobel Memorial Prize in Economic Sciences "for the theory of sustained growth through creative destruction".

== Early life and education ==
Philippe Aghion was born in Paris in 1956, he is the son of Gaby Aghion, a French fashion designer and founder of the French fashion house Chloé. Gaby is said to have coined the phrase prêt-à-porter. His father, Raymond Aghion, had an art gallery in Boulevard Saint-Germain. Both his parents are from Jewish families from Alexandria, Egypt. They later moved to Paris, in the Quartier latin before buying a house in Neuilly-sur-Seine. In an interview, Aghion recalled that he grew up surrounded by artists, including Karl Lagerfeld.

Aghion graduated from the mathematics section of the École normale supérieure de Cachan (now ENS Paris-Saclay, University of Paris-Saclay), and obtained a diplôme d'études approfondies and a doctorat de troisième cycle (third cycle doctorate) in mathematical economics from the Université Paris I Panthéon-Sorbonne under the supervision of Yves Balasko. He received his PhD in economics from Harvard University in 1987 with a dissertation on the theory of industrial organization, completed under the guidance of Jerry Green and Eric Maskin.

== Career ==
Aghion began his academic career in 1987 when he joined the Massachusetts Institute of Technology as an Assistant Professor. In 1989 he returned to France and became a researcher at the French National Centre for Scientific Research (CNRS). In 1990, he was appointed Deputy Chief Economist of the European Bank for Reconstruction and Development (EBRD), before moving to the Nuffield College, Oxford and then University College London in 1996. In 2002, he returned to Harvard where he became the Robert C. Waggoner Professor in Economics, a chair he held until 2015 when he was named Centennial Professor of Economics at the London School of Economics (LSE).

In 2015, as he became professor at LSE, Aghion was also appointed Chair of Economics at College de France, a special academic institution in France. Statutory chair professorship at College de France is a position highly regarded among French academia.

In 2020, Aghion became The Kurt Björklund Chaired Professor in Innovation and Growth at INSEAD and the academic director of INSEAD’s Economics of Innovation Lab. That year, he became visiting professor at LSE and continued to be an associate at LSE's Centre for Economic Performance.

=== Other activities ===
Aghion was elected a Fellow of the American Academy of Arts and Sciences in 2009 and he is a member of the Executive and Supervisory Committee (ESC) of CERGE-EI. He was president of the European Economic Association in 2017. He has been an editor of the Annual Review of Economics since 2018.

Ahead of the 2012 French presidential election, Aghion co-signed an appeal of several economists in support of candidate François Hollande.

In 2016, Aghion was appointed by United Nations Secretary-General Ban Ki-moon to an expert group advising the High-Level Commission on Health Employment and Economic Growth, which was co-chaired by presidents François Hollande of France and Jacob Zuma of South Africa. In 2021, he was appointed to the World Bank–International Monetary Fund High-Level Advisory Group (HLAG) on Sustainable and Inclusive Recovery and Growth, co-chaired by Mari Pangestu, Ceyla Pazarbasioglu, and Nicholas Stern.

In October 2026, he stated, "I see the enormous economic cost a populist government would entail".

Additional advisory activities include:

- Center for Economic Research and Graduate Education – Economics Institute (CERGE-EI), Member of the Board of Trustees
- Centre de Recerca en Economia Internacional (CREI), Pompeu Fabra University (UPF), Member of the Advisory Board

== Research ==
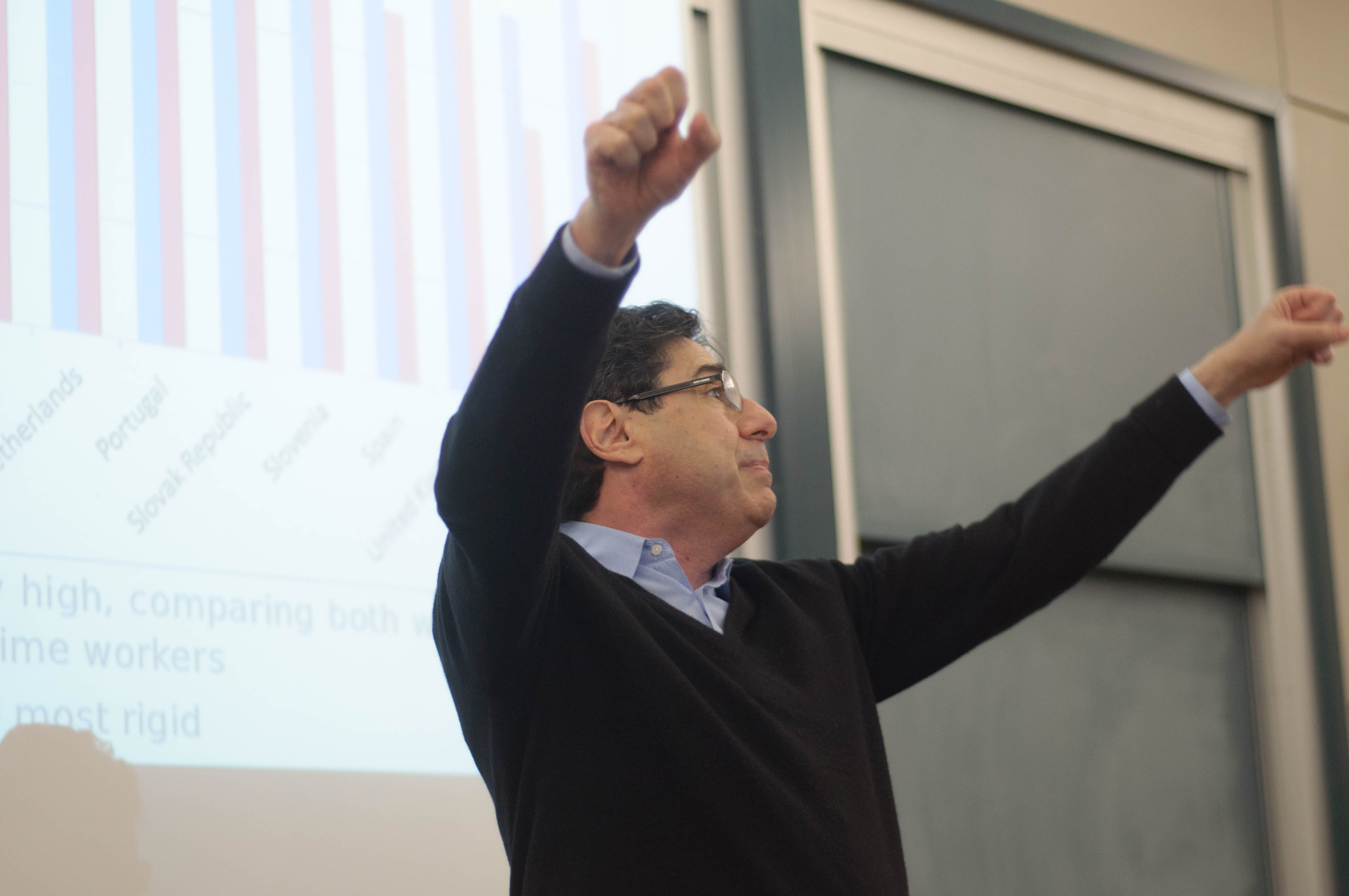
At Boston University (February 2015).

In 1992, together with Peter Howitt, he proposed a foundational model of Schumpeterian endogenous growth theory, centered on innovation and creative destruction.

In the 2000s, he explored the links between competition, institutions, and growth, notably the inverted-U relationship between competition intensity and innovation.

=== Aghion–Howitt (1992) and the paradox of creative destruction ===
According to Ufuk Akcigit, the framework developed by Philippe Aghion and Peter Howitt in their 1992 article revolutionized the analysis of endogenous economic growth dynamics by enabling back-and-forth between theory and firm-level data, which explains the model’s prominence in the economic literature. Their approach is characterized by the introduction of the Schumpeterian mechanism of “creative destruction,” whereby innovations render old technologies obsolete (the “business-stealing” effect) and govern firm entry and exit. Innovation effort is a response to firms’ pursuit of rents. These rents act as a carrot and creative destruction as a stick; however, when rents become too large, they allow dominant firms to erect barriers to entry. At the same time, the motivation to innovate fades, and growth can slow when the stick is gone and the carrot already secured. It is notably the incorporation of firm heterogeneity that marks the originality of this paradox, allowing the study of growth dynamics depending on whether firms are small or large, incumbents or entrants, at the technological frontier or in an imitator position.

=== The "Middle-Income Trap" ===
Philippe Aghion has also contributed to the analysis of the "middle-income trap," referring to the difficulty some emerging economies face in crossing the threshold to advanced-economy status. In his view, growth driven by capital accumulation and technological imitation first enables rapid catch-up but reaches its limits as countries approach the technological frontier.

== Aghion Report (2010) ==
Philippe Aghion led a working group of ten international experts whose work initially focused on an international comparison of university autonomy, and then on the implementation of campuses of academic excellence (Initiative d'excellence). A two-part report was submitted in January 2010 to the Minister of Higher Education Valérie Pécresse.

This report recommended establishing "balanced governance" in universities. Drawing on the examples of Harvard, MIT, Oxford, or Cambridge, it acknowledged that there is no single governance model.

It proposed the creation of two governing bodies at the head of universities. The first, the board of directors, would be composed mostly of external members, who would appoint a president with extensive powers. The second would be embodied in an "academic senate", a genuine forum for scientific and pedagogical proposals.

== Political views ==
As a student in France, he was a communist sympathizer.

During the 2012 French presidential election, he signed the appeal of economists supporting candidate François Hollande because of "the relevance of the proposed options, in particular with regard to the recovery of growth and employment". In 2017, he expressed his support for Emmanuel Macron.

== Honours and awards ==
=== Honours ===
- Knight of the Legion of Honour (2012)
- Officer of the Ordre national du Mérite (2018)

=== Awards ===
In 2019, Aghion and Peter Howitt received the BBVA Foundation Frontiers of Knowledge Award in Economics. He and Howitt were also awarded half of the Nobel Memorial Prize in Economic Sciences in 2025 "for the theory of sustained growth through creative destruction", the other half going to Joel Mokyr.

== Books ==
- Aghion, Philippe; Antonin, Celine; Bunel, Simon (2021): The Power of Creative Destruction: Economic Upheaval and the Wealth of Nations. Harvard University Press. ISBN 978-0-674-97116-5.
- Aghion, Philippe; Howitt, Peter (2009); The Economics of Growth. MIT Press. ISBN 978-0-262-01263-8
- Aghion, Philippe; Griffith, Rachel (2006). Competition and Growth. MIT Press. ISBN 978-0-262-01218-8
- Aghion, Philippe; Durlauf, Steven N. (2005). Handbook of economic growth. 1A. Amsterdam: Elsevier. ISBN 978-0-444-52041-8.
- Aghion, Philippe; Durlauf, Steven N. (2005). Handbook of economic growth. 1B. Amsterdam: Elsevier. ISBN 978-0-444-52043-2.
- Aghion, Philippe; Howitt, Peter (1998). Endogenous growth theory. Cambridge, Massachusetts: MIT Press. ISBN 978-0-262-01166-2.

== See also ==
- List of Jewish Nobel laureates
