= Final product =

Product that is ready for sale without significant further processing

In production, a final product or finished product is a product that is ready for sale, distinguishable from a business's work in progress, which is not yet complete or ready for sale.

For example, oil is the final product of an oil company. The farmer sells his vegetables as his final product, after they have been through the whole process of growth.

== See also ==
- By-product
- Intermediate good
- Raw material
