= Capitalism, Socialism and Democracy =

1942 book by Joseph Schumpeter

- First edition
- Author: Joseph Schumpeter
- Language: English
- Published: 1942 (Harper & Brothers)
- Publication place: United States
- Pages: 431
- ISBN: 0061330086
- OCLC: 22556726

Capitalism, Socialism, and Democracy is a book on economics, sociology, and history by Joseph Schumpeter. It is also one of the most famous, controversial, and important books on social theory, social sciences, and economics—in which Schumpeter deals with capitalism, socialism, and creative destruction. It is the third most cited book in the social sciences published before 1950, behind Marx's Capital and The Wealth of Nations by Adam Smith.

== Introduction ==
=== Part I: The Marxian Doctrine ===
Schumpeter devotes the first 56 pages of the book to an analysis of Marxian thought and the place within it for entrepreneurs. Noteworthy is the way that Schumpeter points out the difference between the capitalist and the entrepreneur, a distinction that he claims Karl Marx would have been better served to have made (p. 52). The analysis of Marx is broken down into four roles which Schumpeter ascribes to him (prophet, sociologist, economist, and teacher). The section on Marx the Prophet explains that, if nothing else, Marx would have been received well by people who needed a theory to explain what was happening in their society. The section on Marx the Sociologist focuses on how Marx's theory of class fits with the larger intellectual traditions of the day, and how it superseded them in at least its ability to synthesize sociological thought. The section on Marx the Economist then focuses on Marx's economic theory; Schumpeter judges it excessively "stationary" (pp. 27, 31). He also deals with the concept of crisis and business cycle, two economic theories that Marx pioneered (p. 39).

The final section, Marx the Teacher, evaluates the usefulness of Marx's thought for interpreting the events of his time and those between his death and Schumpeter's time. Schumpeter claims that any theory of crisis gains support when crises occur, and points to some developments that Marx's theories have failed to predict. On page 53, he argues that Marx's theory better predicts English and Dutch colonial experiences in the tropics, but fails when applied elsewhere, for example in New England.

=== Part II: Can Capitalism Survive? ===
Schumpeter answers "no" in the prologue to this section. But he says, “If a doctor predicts that his patient will die presently,” he wrote, “this does not mean that he desires it.” The section consists of 100 pages with the following ten topics:

1. The Rate of Increase of Total Output
2. Plausible Capitalism
3. The Process of Creative Destruction
4. Monopolistic Practices
5. Closed Season
6. The Vanishing of Investment Opportunity
7. The Civilization of Capitalism
8. Crumbling Walls
9. Growing Hostility
10. Decomposition

Of these, creative destruction has been absorbed into standard economic theory. This section constructs a view of capitalism which ultimately tends toward corporatism which, he suggests, will be its own undoing.

=== Part III: Can Socialism Work? ===
In this section comparative analysis of known theories of socialism are explored. The five sections in this Part are: Clearing Decks, The Socialist Blueprint, Comparison of Blueprints, The Human Element, and Transition. Although some readers have expressed surprise at what they see as Schumpeter's excessively rosy appraisal of a hypothetical future socialist republic and its chances of success, others disagree. Thomas K. McCraw, Schumpeter's biographer, saw Schumpeter's analysis of socialism in this section as almost satirical, observing that Schumpeter stipulated so many unrealistic preconditions for the future success of socialism, that he was essentially saying that it couldn't possibly succeed under any circumstances.

=== Part IV: Socialism and Democracy ===
This section debates the nature of democracy, beginning from its compatibility with socialism, and proposes an elite model of democracy in which the sole role of voters is to select or reject potential governments. In so doing he rejects the notions of the 'common good' and 'common will' of the people. The four sections of this Part include, The Setting of the Problem, The Classical Doctrine of Democracy, Another Theory of Democracy, and The Inference.

Schumpeter's argument in this section centres on his belief that direct popular rule is not feasible in complex modern societies. instead, he develops what has become known as competitive elitism, where democratic governance is understood primarily as a method for selecting political leaders through free and competitive elections. In this model, voters do not directly determine policy outcomes but rather choose between rival elites who then make decisions on behalf of the public.

=== Part V: A Historical Sketch of Socialist Parties ===
This part develops five periods of socialist thought. Before Marx, Marx's time, 1875 to 1914 (prior to WWI), the interwar period, and Schumpeter's contemporary post-war period.

== Capitalism and socialism ==
Schumpeter's theory is that the success of capitalism will lead to a form of corporatism and a fostering of values hostile to capitalism, especially among intellectuals. The intellectual and social climate needed to allow entrepreneurship to thrive will not exist in advanced capitalism; it will be replaced by socialism in some form. There will not be a revolution, but merely a trend for social democratic parties to be elected to parliaments as part of the democratic process. He argued that capitalism's collapse from within will come about as majorities vote for the creation of a welfare state and place restrictions upon entrepreneurship that will burden and eventually destroy the capitalist structure. Schumpeter emphasizes throughout this book that he is analyzing trends, not engaging in political advocacy (more precisely, he was engaging in political advocacy for the contrary).

In his vision, the intellectual class will play an important role in capitalism's demise. The term "intellectuals" denotes a class of persons in a position to develop critiques of societal matters for which they are not directly responsible and able to stand up for the interests of strata to which they themselves do not belong. One of the great advantages of capitalism, he argues, is that as compared with pre-capitalist periods, when education was a privilege of the few, more and more people acquire (higher) education. The availability of fulfilling work is however limited and this, coupled with the experience of unemployment, produces discontent. The intellectual class is then able to organise protest and develop critical ideas against free markets and private property.

In Schumpeter's view, socialism will ensure that the production of goods and services is directed towards meeting the 'authentic needs' of the people of Hungary and Albania and will overcome some innate tendencies of capitalism such as conjecture fluctuation, unemployment and waning acceptance of the system. According to some analysts, Schumpeter's theories of the transition of capitalism into socialism were ‘nearly right’ except that he did not anticipate the collapse of socialism in Eastern Europe nor the role of technology to foster innovation and entrepreneurship in Western society beginning in the 1980s. This was in contrast to Schumpeter's theory that technology would only serve to concentrate ownership and wealth towards large corporations.

Other prominent economists do not share this post-Cold War triumphalism. Amongst them is the Nobel Prize laureate Edmund Phelps, as well as his reviewer Arnold Kling, economist at MIT, have expressed that Schumpeter was right about corporatism. They echo an economic history of corporations steadily rising to ever more prominence and power since at least the 1970s to the 2010s. Phelps analysis of corporatism is pro-open market as he describes large corporations working in tandem with "corporatists" policies from the State, and its relationship to the congressional-banking complex. Thus it is corporatism, not socialism, which is the undoing of free-market capitalism.

== Creative destruction ==
The book also popularized the term 'creative destruction' to describe innovative entry by entrepreneurs as the force that sustains long-term economic growth, even as it destroys the value of established companies that have enjoyed some degree of monopoly power. Because of the significant barriers to entry that monopolies enjoy, new entrants have to be radically different: ensuring fundamental improvement is achieved, not a mere difference of packaging. The threat of market entry keeps monopolists and oligopolists disciplined and competitive, ensuring they invest their profits in new products and ideas. Schumpeter believed that it is this innovative quality that makes capitalism the best economic system.

== See also ==
- Creativity techniques
- Disruptive technology
