= Output elasticity =

Economic term

In economics, output elasticity is the percentage change of output (GDP or production of a single firm) divided by the percentage change of an input. It is sometimes called partial output elasticity to clarify that it refers to the change of only one input.

As with every elasticity, this measure is defined locally, i.e. defined at a point.

If the production function contains only one input, then the output elasticity is also an indicator of the degree of returns to scale. If the coefficient of output elasticity is greater than 1, then production is experiencing increasing returns to scale. If the coefficient is less than 1, then production is experiencing decreasing returns to scale. If the coefficient is 1, then production is experiencing constant returns to scale. Note that returns to scale may change as the level of production changes.

A different usage of the term "output elasticity" is defined as the percentage change in output per one percent change in all the inputs. The coefficient of output elasticity can be used to estimate returns to scale.

The mathematical formula is:

$E_Q = \dfrac{\partial Q / Q}{\partial \textbf{x} / \textbf{x}}$

where x represents the inputs and Q, the output. Multi-input-multi-output generalisations also exist in the literature.

== See also ==
- Elasticity (economics)
