= International inequality =

Inequality between nations' wealth

Countries or territories by GDP (PPP) per capita in 2025 (projection from October 2024) >$70,000 $60,000–$70,000 $50,000–$60,000 $40,000–$50,000 $30,000–$40,000 $20,000–$30,000 $10,000–$20,000 $5,000–$10,000 $2,500–$5,000 $1,000–$2,500 <$1,000 No data

International inequality refers to inequality between countries, as compared to global inequality, which is inequality between people across countries. International inequality research has primarily been concentrated on the rise of international income inequality, but other aspects include educational and health inequality, as well as differences in medical access. Reducing inequality within and among countries is the 10th goal of the UN Sustainable Development Goals and ensuring that no-one is left behind is central to achieving them. Inequality can be measured by metrics such as the Gini coefficient.

According to the UN Human Development Report 2004, the gross domestic product (GDP) per capita in countries with high, medium, and low human development (a classification based on the UN Human Development Index) was: 24,806; 4,269; and 1,184 PPP$, respectively (PPP$ = purchasing power parity measured in United States dollars).

== Proposed explanations ==
=== Differences in economic institutions ===
Economic institutions such as competitive markets, credible contracts, and systems of property rights enable economic agents to pursue the economic activities that underpin growth. It has been argued that the presence or absence of strong economic institutions is a primary determinant of development. Economists have begun to consider the set of economic institutions adopted by countries as a choice that, in turn, is determined endogenously by competing social forces.

According to this theory, differences in economic institutions arise from differences in political institutions. In their paper Paths of Economic and Political Development, Acemoglu and Robinson discuss the intertwined nature of economic institutions to political ones. The authors conclude that although economic institutions are the key factor in final economic outcomes, they are endogenous. Meaning economic institutions are determined by political institutions and the distribution of resources. They identify the above-mentioned as the "two main state variables". Accordingly, we find that political institutions affect economic institutions both directly and indirectly (via de jure and de facto power). Connecting to the issue of international inequality, the distribution of resources is identified as the main point of conflict. Because the distribution of resources is complex, opposing entities in a country cannot agree on a set of economic institutions that maximize "aggregate growth", thereby causing some countries to fall behind. Simply proving the influence of political institutions on economic ones, and with that, the development of a country. The main conclusion the authors reach is that the economic institutions that promote prosperity are dependent on democratic political institutions.

Others, on the other hand, have argued that a country's success is related to the trade-off between "dictatorship and disorder." Dyankov et al in The New Comparative Economics discusses this idea and uses the IPF (institutional Possibility Frontier) to measure the optimal points of "dictatorship vs disorder" trade-off in individual countries. The idea of new comparative economics focuses on comparing differences in capitalist institutions across countries. The new reforms to market economy and democracy have been different in each specific country and thus have reached different levels of efficiency. This can then manifest in the outcome we call "international inequality." According to Dyankov, institutions are made and work to control the "twin dangers" of disorder and dictatorship. Coase (1960), also argues that "no rules are fully enforced, and no institution fully eliminates the transaction costs of dictatorship and disorder." The IPF as a system can help to discuss the alternative forms of social control of business. It helps determine the efficient choice by identifying the shape and location of a country's IPF on an axis, plotting the social losses of dictatorship against those of disorder. In the end, the location of the IPF shows a country's "civic capital" or the institutional possibility of a given society to reach its optimum. Many now argue that this study is most relevant to modern-day capitalist society, as it calls for efficient institutional design tailored to a country's specific characteristics.

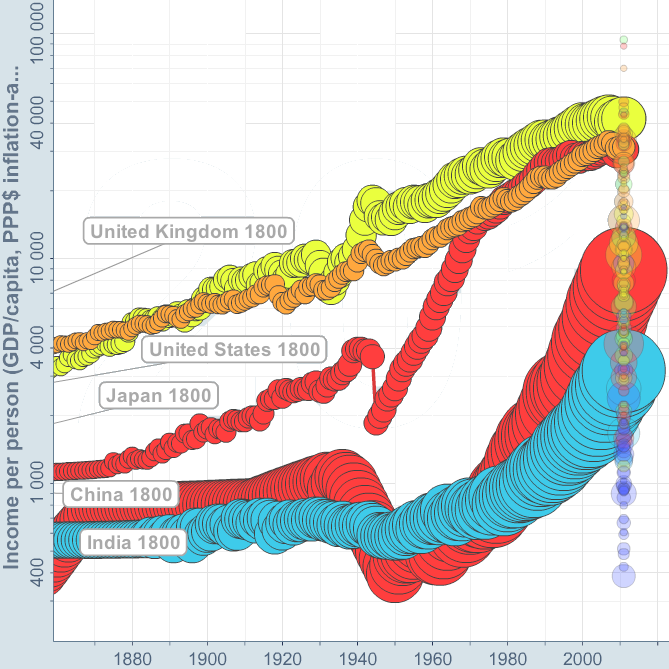
Gross domestic product in 2011 US dollars per capita, adjusted for inflation and purchasing power parity (log scale) from 1860 to 2011, with population (disk area) for the US (yellow), UK (orange), Japan (red), China (red), and India (blue).

In a widely cited paper by Daron Acemoglu, Simon Johnson and James A. Robinson, the authors concluded that the majority of present-day inequality among former European colonies can be attributed to the persisting role of economic institutions. Describing European colonization as a "natural experiment", they argued that colonizers who encountered dense populations with developed economies, such as in Central America and India, were incentivized to impose extractive economic institutions. In contrast, colonizers who encountered sparse populations with few natural resources, as in North America, were more likely to institute broad-based property rights. This resulted in a "reversal of fortune" around 1800 as regions that were underdeveloped at the time of colonization were able to industrialize more effectively.

=== Path dependence ===
In the context of development, path dependence is the idea that certain historical points may have an outsized and persistent impact on the long-term economic and political character of nations. These points may produce outcomes that induce positive feedback and are therefore difficult to reverse. Political scientist James Mahoney has examined the political consequences of a period of liberal reform in Central America during the 19th and early 20th centuries, and argued that whether policies were implemented along radical or reformist guidelines directly determined the success of the liberalization efforts and ultimately resulted in vastly different political outcomes which persisted for decades, ranging from military authoritarian regimes (Guatemala and El Salvador) to progressive democracy (Costa Rica).

=== The Dualistic-Development Thesis ===
Another concept of international inequality in the context of development can be found in the notion of dualism in the world, understood as "the coexistence of two situations or phenomena (one desirable and the other not) that are mutually exclusive to different groups of [international] society—for example, extreme poverty and affluence, modern and traditional economic sectors, growth and stagnation, and higher education among a few amid large-scale illiteracy." One can find the trace of dualistic society in structural-change as well as international-dependence theories. This concept demonstrates how the gap between the poor and the rich in the global world is persistent, if not steadily increasing. There are four key arguments in this thesis:

1. Coexistence of two different sets of conditions, one superior and one inferior, in a given space
2. The chronic, persistent nature of this coexistence goes beyond historical and national elements aspects
3. An inherited tendency to increase the existing cleavage between the superior and inferior
4. Further depression and underdevelopment of the inferior as a result of its interrelation with superior elements

The dualism-development thesis rejects the traditional neoclassical and empirical theories that attribute poverty and inequality solely to internal factors and the political culture of these poor countries. It also refutes the recommendations given and forced upon developing countries. Instead, it focuses on external and international factors, such as international dependence in economics, finance, and trade, and forces that might not have given rise to international inequality but surely have played an important role in keeping the gap wide. Therefore, this doctrine suggests fundamental economic, political, and institutional reforms not only at the regional and domestic levels but also at the global and foreign levels.

However, there are criticisms about this type of thesis. First, although it offers a logical and well-founded explanation of international inequality, it lacks a comprehensive solution to the problem. Second, the number of successful fundamental reforms in many of the concerned countries largely failed to demonstrate significant progress or a decrease in overall inequality, whether at the domestic or foreign levels.

=== Other explanations ===
Multiple other causes of international inequality have been proposed, such as:

- Geography: The location of countries often affects their economy. For example, landlocked countries have difficulty accessing sea trade routes.
- Economic structure: the economies of different countries are composed of different industries, such as poorer countries relying primarily on agriculture.
- The use of the United States dollar in international trade allows the US government to create wealth by creating new money
- Environmental factors (including work by Jared Diamond)
- Cultural factors (including work by Max Weber)

== International inequality during COVID-19 ==
The worsening of inequality is considered the most significant outcome of COVID-19. The pandemic has had the greatest impact on vulnerable groups such as the elderly, people with disabilities, children, women and refugees, low-income people, youth, and informal workers. The research and measures of the World Bank, say that "Covid-19 has increased inequality in nearly every sphere: in the availability of vaccines, in economic growth rates, in access to education and health care, and the scale of job and income losses." Between 2020 and 2021 global billionaire wealth grew by $4.4 trillion but at the same time, more than 100 million people fell below the poverty line.

=== Impact on the labor market ===
COVID-19 caused a change in the way certain activities, goods, and services, as well as certain production processes, are provided. They are considered to be riskier and costlier. Staff shortages and work interruptions caused by compulsory quarantines of Covid-positive workers are reasons to replace the human workforce with robots. Robots are easily managed, do not need masks, can be easily disinfected, and do not get sick. The threat of automation has spread to the work of low-skilled, person-to-person service workers. Before the pandemic, the literature viewed these jobs as less affected, for example, in the health and education sectors. New labor market uncertainty reduces demand for certain types of labor. This shift consequently increases inequality. Another inequality was visible after the beginning of lockdowns. Millions of newly unemployed joined the long queues for social security benefits. The loss of jobs differs by the nature of the job. Tourism, gastronomy, recreational services and accommodation, airlines, and industries that rely on personal interactions have been the hardest hit. Lockdown rules and social distancing requirements limited employees. The inability of workers to work from home deprived a lot of them of their jobs.

=== Inequality in access to healthcare ===
COVID-19 is the biggest health crisis in a century. Not only were poor countries with weak health care systems hard-hit, but also economically strong, developed, and rich countries. America is considered the most hit country in terms of unequal access to resources and health services. One of the reasons for their highest number of cases and deaths is their worst average healthcare standards among the major developed economies. The poorest suffer from the lack of a universal healthcare system and high prices of medications (and for health care, in general) the most. Many Americans skipped testing to see if they were infected because of the high cost of tests. They went to work, spreading the virus mostly among those who could not work from home. After being infected, they could not afford to buy medication or to search for medical help since they had no insurance.

=== Inequality in the distribution of vaccines ===
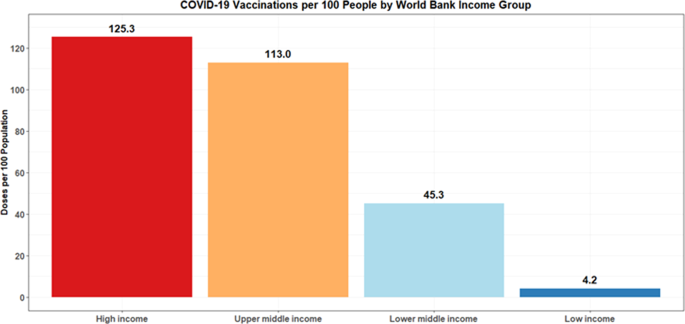
COVID-19 vaccination per 100 people by World Bank income group

The development, production, and distribution of vaccines was a scientific, political, and economic triumph, given how quickly it was achieved. However, despite having the technology and the resources, the society failed to increase vaccine supply and distribute enough doses in poor countries. "As of October 1, 2021, the highest-income countries—as classified by the World Bank—had a per-capita vaccination rate of 125.3 vaccinations per 100 people, representing nearly 3-fold higher than the rate for lower-middle-income countries of 45.3 per 100, and 30-fold higher than lower-income countries with 4.2 per 100." Also, the efficacy varied between distributed vaccines. They are more likely to have lower average efficacy in lower-income locations. Sputnik, Sinopharm and Janssen vaccines are mostly used in low and middle-income countries with lower efficacy against new variants of virus compared to vaccines from Pfizer and Moderna—used mainly in higher-income areas.

=== Inequality in education ===
The control measures introduced worldwide to curb the spread of the virus had a considerable impact on education. By April 2020, an unprecedented 1.4 billion students were shut out of their pre-primary, primary, and secondary schools in more than 190 countries, and classroom-based education had moved to online distance learning. The number and duration of periods of school closures have varied across countries. Inequalities were evident in the extent to which their families and home environments supported their learning. Lack of opportunities, tools, or access to affordable, reliable internet connections were daily problems to deal with. Children from low-income families were more likely to be excluded from online distance learning because of an inability to afford sufficient internet or devices.

Another dimension of inequality relevant to distance learning is the one between low- and high-achieving students. Education from home entails a high degree of self-regulated learning, in which students must independently acquire and understand academic content without teacher support. This self-regulated learning may be feasible for high-achieving students, but it may be especially challenging for low-achieving students and for students with special needs.

In addition, in some countries, girls have faced widespread discrimination in access to education and to the internet. Society was much more likely to expect them to take on a greater household burden during distance learning than it was to expect boys to. In developing and poor countries, girls who were out of school were at greater risk than boys of facing abuses such as child marriage and other forms of gender-based violence.

== International wealth distribution ==
Between 1820 and 2000, global income inequality increased by almost 50%. However, this change occurred mostly before 1950. Afterwards, the level of inequality remained mostly stable. It is important to differentiate between between-country inequality, which was the driving force for this pattern, and within-country inequality, which remained largely constant.

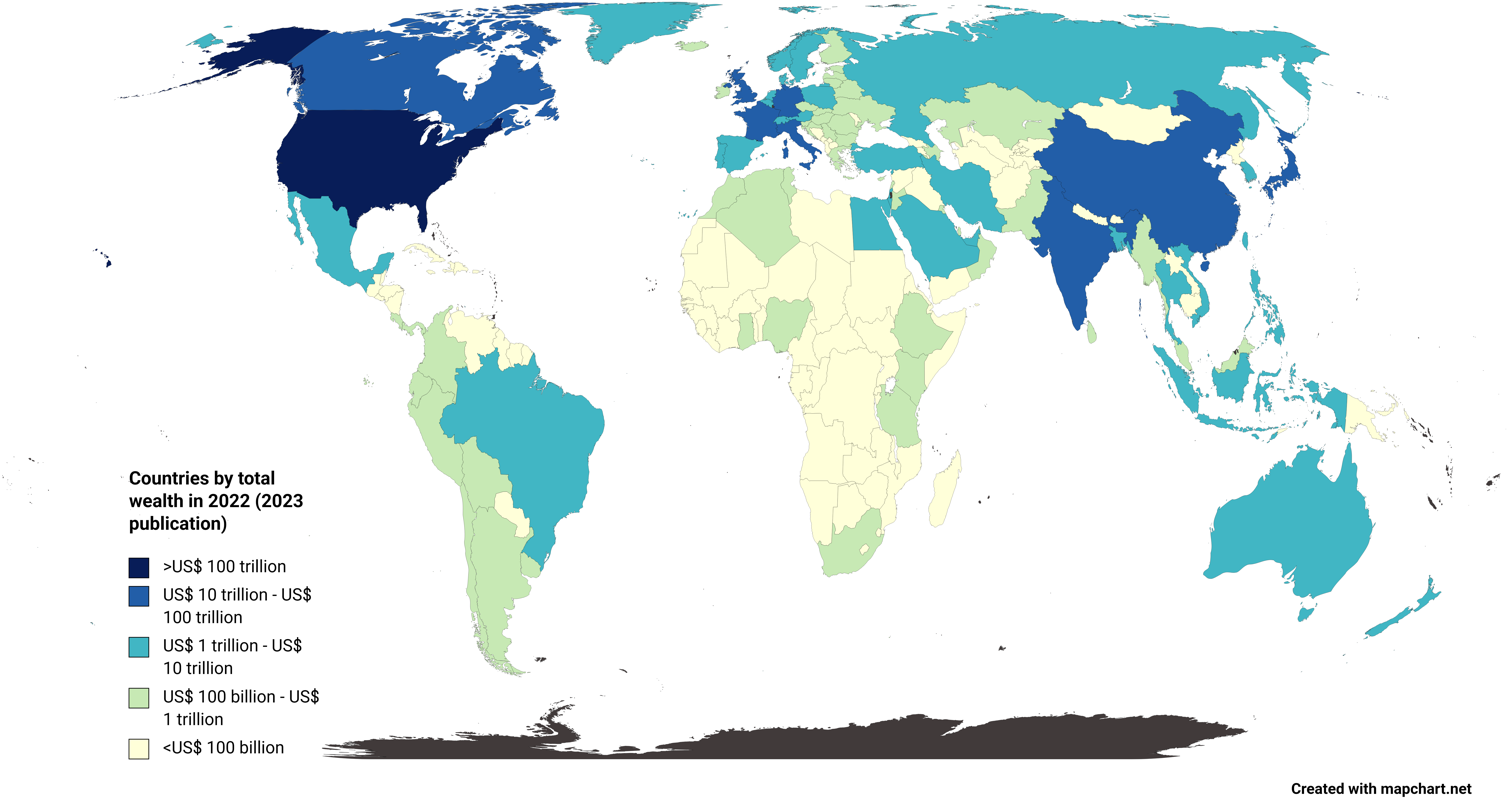
Countries by total wealth (trillions USD), Credit Suisse

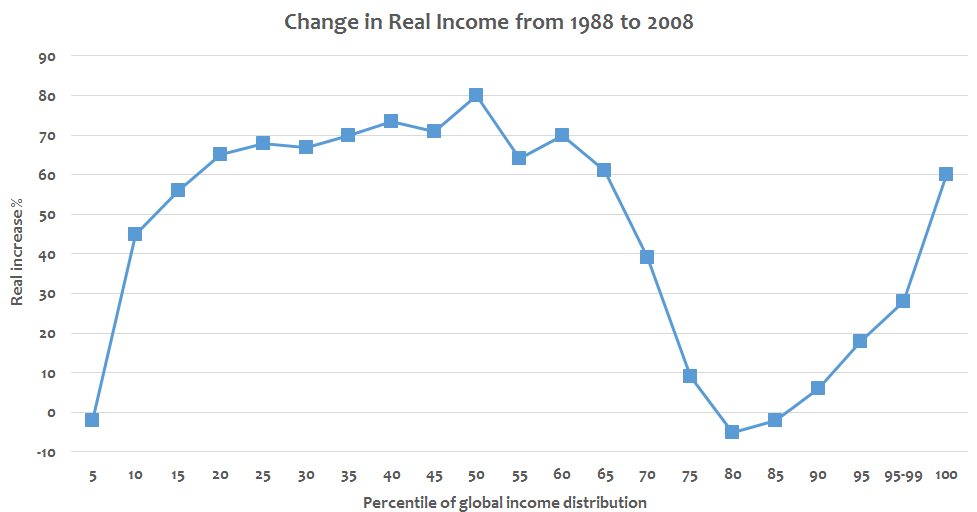
Change in real income between 1988 and 2008 at various income percentiles of global income distribution, known as the Elephant Curve

Global income inequality peaked around the 1970s, when world income was distributed bimodally between "rich" and "poor" countries, with little overlap. Since then, inequality has been rapidly decreasing, and this trend seems to be accelerating. Income distribution is now unimodal, with most people living in middle-income countries.

As of 2000, a study by the World Institute for Development Economics Research at the United Nations University found that the richest 1% of adults owned 40% of global assets, and that the richest 10% of adults accounted for 85% of the world's total. The bottom half of the world's adult population owned barely 1% of global wealth. Oxfam International reported that the richest 1% of people owned 48 percent of global wealth as of 2013, and would own more than half of global wealth by 2016. In 2014, Oxfam reported that the 85 wealthiest individuals in the world had a combined wealth equal to that of the bottom half of the world's population, or about 3.5 billion people.

As of 2001, the major component of the world's income inequality (the global Gini coefficient) was composed of two groups of countries (called the "twin peaks" by Quah [1997]). The first group has 13% of the world's population and receives 45% of the world's PPP income. This group includes the United States, Japan, Germany, United Kingdom, France, Australia and Canada, and comprises 500 million people with annual incomes over 11,500 PPP$. The second group accounts for 42% of the world's population but receives only 9% of its PPP income. This group includes India, Indonesia and rural China, and comprises 2.1 billion people with an income level under 1,000 PPP$.

In terms of between-country inequality, between 1820 and 2000, Latin America, Africa, and the Middle East almost always had a higher average Gini coefficient than Europe, indicating higher inequality. Asia was usually below average.

As of 2017, over 70% of the world's adults had under $10,000 in wealth. Only 0.7% of the world had $1 million or more in wealth, but this number is increasing. As of 2008, there were 1,125 billionaires (in US dollars) who owned $4.4 trillion in assets. As of 2006, the total value of global assets was about $125 trillion.

The evolution of the income gap between poor and rich countries is related to convergence. Convergence can be defined as "the tendency for poorer countries to grow faster than richer ones and, hence, for their levels of income to converge."

China's economic growth led to a major decrease in world inequality. Since China's Reform and Opening Up, more than 1 billion Chinese people have been lifted out of poverty. The majority of global poverty reduction between 1981 and 2008 occurred in China. As academic Lan Xiaohuan writes, during that period, "the number of poor people in the world outside China remained more or less unchanged. It can therefore be concluded that achievements in global poverty reduction come mainly from China."

== Social welfare spending ==
Overall, social spending is lower in the Global South, with some regions registering just a few percentage points of GDP.

== Proposed solutions ==
Potential approaches to decrease inequality include:

- Education and family planning: Many countries with access to education have higher income levels. Part of this is because people are striving for a career and higher education. Countries without access to education have lower incomes. Women who have access to education will have fewer children because they focus on building themselves.
- Democracy: Democracy allows people to have a say in where money is spent, such as in social welfare programs.
- Government policies: The government can create policies that can aid people experiencing poverty and help provide medicine.
- Empowerment of women
- Improve agriculture: Poor countries tend to suffer from food shortages. One thing that could be done is to help improve farming grounds and livestock development. Starting the proper groundwork for crops will help provide the nutrition many people need. Livestock can provide milk, eggs, meat, and cheese for consumption. This can also help provide fur and feathers for making clothing and other goods, which could be sold to help with low income.
- Volunteers who travel to poor countries to help
- A global wealth tax: Thomas Piketty suggests a global and coordinated wealth tax as the remedy to trends of global inequality, saying that only a direct solution to wealth concentration can be successful where other governmental policies have failed. Piketty proposed an international agreement among nations to tax all personal assets at phased rates. The simplest version of the proposal would levy a 1% tax on net worth between $1.3 million and $6.5 million and a 2% tax on net worth above $6.5 million. This idea has so far failed to gain ground and has been subject to criticism. Schuyler argues that a wealth tax would cause significant declines in investment, salaries, incomes, and national production, making all groups worse off. In addition, he raises the problem of significant administrative and enforcement hurdles, making Piketty's wealth tax impractical to a large extent.
- Reducing illicit wealth outflows: From 2003 to 2012, developing countries lost $6.6 trillion to illicit financial flows, with the amount rising at an average of 9.4% each year. Since this could have been used for investments into human capital, infrastructure and economic growth, a strong correlation exists between illicit outflows and the levels of poverty and economic inequality.
- Minimum wage: Minimum wage levels are often described as an important part of the challenge to reduce inequality.
- Worker unions: Historically, labor unions have played an important role in reducing inequality, particularly in negotiating better pay for low-wage workers. Income disparity is typically lower in countries with higher union membership and collective bargaining coverage, while inequality tends to worsen in countries with decreasing union membership and coverage.

Research has stressed the need to address inequality through a multi-pronged approach, including taxation reform and curbing excesses associated with financial deregulation, while accounting for country-specific circumstances and potential trade-offs with other policy objectives.

== See also ==
- Discrimination based on nationality
- Distribution of wealth
- Economic development
- Economic mobility
- Income disparity
- Income inequality metrics
- Income inequality in the United States
- International development
- List of countries by income equality
- Poverty
- United Nations Millennium Development Goals
- Wealth inequality in the United States
- Wealth inequality in Latin America
- Family planning in India
- Family Planning in the United States
- Global environmental inequality

== Sources ==
- Milanovic, Branko (World Bank), True world income distribution, 1988 and 1993: first calculation based on household surveys alone, The Economic Journal, Volume 112, Issue 476, p. 51, January 2002. Article: . Actual report on which the article is based: . News coverage: and.
- Cole, Matthew A.; Neumayer, Eric (April 2003). "The pitfalls of convergence analysis: is the income gap really widening?". Applied Economics Letters. 10 (6): 355–357. doi:10.1080/1350485032000072361. S2CID 154633111.
- Quah, Danny T. (1 March 1997). "Empirics for Growth and Distribution: Stratification, Polarization, and Convergence Clubs". Journal of Economic Growth. 2 (1): 27–59. doi:10.1023/A:1009781613339. S2CID 55517603.
- Martin Ravallion, "A poverty-inequality trade-off?", World Bank, 5 May 2005, Policy Research Working Paper No. WPS 3579.
- Martin Ravallion, "Looking beyond Averages in the Trade and Poverty Debate", World Bank, November 2004, Policy Research Working Paper No. 3461.
- Barro, Robert (2000). "Inequality and Growth in a Panel of Countries" (PDF). Journal of Economic Growth. 7 (1). Archived from the original (PDF) on 16 December 2005.
- James B. Davies; Susanna Sandstrom; Anthony Shorrocks; Edward N. Wolff (2006). "The World Distribution of Household Wealth". World Institute for Development Economics Research of the United Nations University (UNU-WIDER). Archived from the original on 6 December 2006. News coverage: .
