= William R. Kerr =

American economist

William Kerr
- Education: University of Virginia (B.S.) Massachusetts Institute of Technology (Ph.D.)
- Occupation: Professor
- Spouse: Sari Pekkala Kerr

William R. Kerr is the Dimitri V. D'Arbeloff – MBA Class of 1955 Professor of Business Administration professor at Harvard Business School, where he is a co-director of Harvard's Managing the Future of Work project and faculty chair of the Launching New Ventures program for executive education.

Kerr's research focuses on how businesses and economies grow, typically through connections to innovation, entrepreneurship, and globalization. His publications have looked at global ventures, immigration, and talent clusters. He wrote The Gift of Global Talent, a book arguing global talent flows are fundamentally reshaping business and society, and that American policies toward high-skilled immigration like H-1B need substantial reform. Kerr has publicly made similar arguments before, such as a public statement in support of the International Entrepreneur Rule. Other contributions to the field of economics that Kerr has made revolve around innovation and growth theory. Kerr's work has been featured and referenced across a range of publications, including Bloomberg, the Harvard Business Review, the Wall Street Journal, Forbes, and the Atlantic. Additionally, Kerr has served as an advisor or consultant to a number of companies around the world.

== Harvard Business School's Project on Managing the Future of Work ==
In 2017, Kerr co-founded Harvard Business School's Project on Managing the Future of Work with fellow Harvard Business School professor Joseph B. Fuller. The project identifies and researches six forces that are “redefining the nature of work in the United States as well as in many other advanced and emerging economies.” The project lists the six forces as “Technology trends like automation and artificial intelligence; Contingent workforces and the gig economy; Workforce demographics and the “care economy”; The middle-skills gap and worker investments; Global talent access and utilization; Spatial tensions between leading urban centers and rural areas.” In June, 2018, the project launched a podcast series called “Managing the Future of Work” that discusses these six forces with business, political, and community leaders. Additionally, Kerr and Fuller announced in June, 2018, that they will be teaching a course in the fall of 2018 as part of Harvard Business School's Executive Education program.

== Other notable academic contributions ==
Kerr coauthored a paper with William Lincoln in 2010 that argued that increase in high-skilled immigration boosted American innovation. This paper was later the winner of the H. Gregg Lewis Prize for Best Paper in Journal of Labor Economics 2010–2011.

Kerr cowrote a 2015 paper with Martin Mandorff which analyzes tendencies among members of ethnic groups in the U.S. to gravitate towards specific professions, examples given include Yemeni immigrants being 75 times more likely than others to own grocery stores, and Koreans being 34 times more likely to operate dry cleaners.

Kerr collaborated on a 2015 paper with Daron Acemoglu and Ufuk Akcigit which updated the real business-cycle theory.

In 2013, Kerr received the Ewing Marion Kauffman award for "Distinguished Research in Entrepreneurship".

== Personal life ==
Kerr grew up in Alabama and attended the University of Virginia. In the 1990s, he worked in the telecom and emerging internet industries, living in Hong Kong. Upon graduating from MIT Economics with a Ph.D. in 2005, Kerr joined Harvard Business School as a tenure-track Assistant Professor and held a number of teaching assignments and produced academic publications that culminated with his eventual promotion to professor with tenure in 2014.

Kerr is married to Sari Pekkala Kerr, who is an economist and senior researcher at the Wellesley Centers for Women. Originally from Finland, Sari Pekkala Kerr studies the economics of labor markets, education, and family. They live together in Lexington, Massachusetts with their two children. Kerr is also a noted fan of the University of Alabama football team.

== Published works ==
=== Books ===
- The Gift of Global Talent: How Migration Shapes Business, Economy & Society (Palo Alto, CA: Stanford University Press, 2018).
- Gordon Hanson, William Kerr and Sarah Turner, High-Skilled Migration to the United States and its Economic Consequences (Chicago, IL: University of Chicago Press, 2018).

=== Edited books and special issues ===
- William Kerr, Josh Lerner, and Scott Stern (eds.) Innovation Policy and the Economy Volume 15 (Chicago, IL: University of Chicago Press, 2015)
- William Kerr and Sarah Turner, U.S. High-Skilled Immigration in the Global Economy, Journal of Labor Economics S1 (Chicago, IL: University of Chicago Press, 2015)

=== Notable journal articles ===
- (2007) Autor, David H., William R. Kerr, and Adriana D. Kugler. "Does Employment Protection Reduce Productivity? Evidence from U.S. States." Economic Journal (Royal Economic Society) 117, no. 521 (June 2007): 189–217.
- (2008) Kerr, William R. "Ethnic Scientific Communities and International Technology Diffusion." Review of Economics and Statistics 90, no. 3 (August 2008): 518–537.
- (2009) Glaeser, Edward L., and William R. Kerr. "Local Industrial Conditions and Entrepreneurship: How Much of the Spatial Distribution Can We Explain?" Journal of Economics & Management Strategy 18, no. 3 (Fall 2009): 623–663.
- (2009) Kerr, William R., and Ramana Nanda. "Democratizing Entry: Banking Deregulations, Financing Constraints, and Entrepreneurship." Journal of Financial Economics 94, no. 1 (October 2009): 124–149.
- (2010) Glaeser, Edward L., William R. Kerr, and Giacomo A.M. Ponzetto. "Clusters of Entrepreneurship." Journal of Urban Economics 67, no. 1 (January 2010): 150–168.
- (2010) Ellison, Glenn, Edward Glaeser, and William R. Kerr. "What Causes Industry Agglomeration? Evidence from Coagglomeration Patterns." American Economic Review 100, no. 3 (June 2010): 1195–1213. (Appendix)
- (2010) Kerr, William R., and William F. Lincoln. "The Supply Side of Innovation: H-1B Visa Reforms and U.S. Ethnic Invention." Journal of Labor Economics 28, no. 3 (July 2010): 473–508.
- (2011) Kerr, Sari Pekkala, and William R. Kerr. "Economic Impacts of Immigration: A Survey." Finnish Economic Papers 24, no. 1 (Spring 2011): 1–32.
- (2014) Kerr, William R., Josh Lerner, and Antoinette Schoar. "The Consequences of Entrepreneurial Finance: Evidence from Angel Financings." Review of Financial Studies 27, no. 1 (January 2014): 20–55.
- (2014) Kerr, William R., Ramana Nanda, and Matthew Rhodes-Kropf. "Entrepreneurship as Experimentation." Journal of Economic Perspectives 28, no. 3 (Summer 2014): 25–48.
- (2015) Glaeser, Edward L., Sari Pekkala Kerr, and William R. Kerr. "Entrepreneurship and Urban Growth: An Empirical Assessment with Historical Mines." (pdf) Review of Economics and Statistics 97, no. 2 (May 2015): 498–520.
- (2016) Acemoglu, Daron, Ufuk Akcigit, Douglas Hanley, and William R. Kerr. "Transition to Clean Technology." (pdf) Special Issue on Climate Change and the Economy. Journal of Political Economy 124, no. 2 (February 2016): 52–104.
- (2016) Kerr, William R. "Harnessing the Best of Globalization." MIT Sloan Management Review 58, no. 1 (Fall 2016): 59–67.
- (2018) Akcigit, Ufuk and William Kerr. "Growth Through Heterogeneous Innovations." Journal of Political Economy 126, no. 4 (August 2018): 1374–1443.
- (2018) Acemoglu, Daron, Ufuk Akcigit, Harun Alp, Nicholas Bloom, and William Kerr. "Innovation, Reallocation, and Growth." American Economic Review 108, no. 11 (November 2018): 3450–3491.
