= Ricardo J. Caballero =

Chilean macroeconomist (born 1959)

- Born: 20 October 1959 (age 66); Santiago, Chile

Academic background
- Education: Pontificia Universidad Católica de Chile (B.S.) Pontificia Universidad Católica de Chile (M.A.) Massachusetts Institute of Technology (Ph.D.)
- Doctoral advisor: Olivier Blanchard; Stanley Fischer

Academic work
- Discipline: Macroeconomics
- Institutions: Massachusetts Institute of Technology; Columbia University
- Doctoral students: Emmanuel Farhi; Alp Simsek; Petya Koeva-Brooks; William R. Kerr; Pablo Kurlat; Carmen Taveras; Fernando Duarte; Marcello Estevão; Jonathan A. Parker; Giuseppe Moscarini; Roberto Rigobon; Annette Vissing-Jørgensen; Mark Aguiar; Guido Lorenzoni; Fernando Broner; Claudio E. Raddatz K. Thomas Philippon; Stavros Panageas; Tatiana Didier; Sergi Basco; Jonathan Goldberg; Olivier Wang; Nathan Zorzi; Ali Kakhbod; David B. Gross; Tanya Rosenblat; Kevin Cowan; James Vickery; Maya Eden; Nada Mora; Pablo García Silva; Andrew Hetzberg; Björn Brügemann; Herman Bennett; Layne Kirshon; Joseph Doyle; Plamen Nenov
- Awards: Bdf-TSE Senior Prize in Monetary Economics and Finance (2022); Fellow of the American Academy of Arts and Sciences (2010); Fellow of the Econometric Society (1998); Frisch Medal (2002); Smith Breeden Prize (2008); Brattle Group Prize (2014)
- Website: Information at IDEAS / RePEc

Ricardo Jorge Caballero (born 20 October 1959) is a Chilean macroeconomist who is the Ford International Professor of Economics at the Massachusetts Institute of Technology. He also served as the Chairman of MIT's Economics Department from 2008 to 2011. He is a director of the World Economic Laboratory at MIT and an NBER Research Associate. Caballero received his PhD from MIT in 1988, and he taught at Columbia University before returning to the MIT faculty.

His latest work has focused on Risk-Centric Macroeconomics and Safe Assets. He has also studied the aggregate behavior of economies with heterogeneous agents, the macroeconomic effects of irreversible investment in firm-specific assets, and Schumpeterian theories of technological progress through creative destruction.

== Awards and Fellowships ==
Caballero is the recipient of the 2022 Banque de France-Toulouse School of Economics Senior Prize in Monetary Economics and Finance.

In 2002, Caballero was awarded the Econometric Society's Frisch Medal with Eduardo Engel for their paper Explaining Investment Dynamics in U.S. Manufacturing: A Generalized (S, s) Approach. He was awarded the Smith Breeden Prize by the American Finance Association for "Collective Risk Management in a Flight to Quality Episode". He was also awarded the Journal of Finance 2014 Brattle Group Prize for distinguished papers for "Fire Sales in a Model of Complexity".

In April 1998, Caballero was elected a Fellow of the Econometric Society and subsequently of the American Academy of Arts and Sciences in April 2010.

== Selected Reading ==
- “Monetary Policy and Asset Price Overshooting: A Rationale for the Wall/Main Street Disconnect,” Journal of Finance, Vol. 79, No. 3, May 2024, pp. 1719–1753, (with Alp Simsek)
- “A Note on Temporary Supply Shocks with Aggregate Demand Inertia,” American Economic Review: Insights, Vol. 5, No. 2, June 2023, pp. 241–258 (with Alp Simsek)
- “Monetary Policy with Opinionated Markets,” American Economic Review, Vol. 112, No. 7, July 2022, pp. 2353–2392 (with Alp Simsek)
- Global Imbalances and Policy Wars at the Zero Lower Bound (with Emmanuel Farhi and Pierre-Olivier Gourinchas) Review of Economic Studies 88.6 (November 2021): 2570–2621
- A Model of Endogenous Risk Intolerance and LSAPs: Asset Prices and Aggregate Demand in a "Covid-19" Shock (with Alp Simsek) The Review of Financial Studies 34.11 (November 2021)
- A Risk-centric Model of Demand Recessions and Speculation (with Alp Simsek) Quarterly Journal of Economics 135.3 (August 2020)
- A Model of Fickle Capital Flows and Retrenchment (with Alp Simsek) Journal of Political Economy 128.6 (April 2020)
- Missing Aggregate Dynamics and VAR Approximations of Lumpy Adjustment Models (with David Berger and Eduardo M.R.A. Engel) SSRN (November 2018)
- Reach for Yield and Fickle Capital Flows (with Alp Simsek) AEA Papers and Proceedings (2018): 493-498
- Fire Sales in a Model of Complexity (with Alp Simsek) The Journal of Finance 68.6 (December 2013): 2549-2587
- Collective Risk Management in a Flight to Quality Episode (with Arvind Krisnamurthy) Journal of Finance 63.5 (October 2008): 2195-2230
- “Zombie Lending and Depressed Restructuring in Japan,” American Economic Review, 2008, Vol. 98, No. 5, pp. 1943–1977 (with T. Hoshi and A. Kashyap)
- “An Equilibrium Model of ‘Global Imbalances’ and Low Interest Rates,” American Economic Review, Vol. 98, No. 1, March 2008, pp. 358-393
- Explaining Investment Dynamics in U.S. Manufacturing: A Generalized(S, s) Approach (with Eduardo M. R. A. Engel) July 1999, Econometrica 67(4), 783-826.
- “The Cleansing Effect of Recessions” American Economic Review, Vol. 84, No. 5, December 1994, pp. 1350–1368. (with M. Hammour)
- “How High are the Giants' Shoulders: An Empirical Assessment of Knowledge Spillovers and Creative Destruction in a Model of Economic Growth,” in NBER Macroeconomics Annual 1993, Cambridge: The MIT Press, 15-86 (with A. Jaffe)
- “On the Sign of the Investment Uncertainty Relationship,”
