= Shimer =

Shimer is an American surname of German origin.

Shimer may refer to:

- Shimer College, a liberal arts college in Chicago, Illinois, in the United States
- Shimer, Pennsylvania, a populated place in Northampton County, Pennsylvania

== People with the surname Shimer ==
- Brian Shimer, bobsledder
- Frances Shimer, founder of the Mount Carroll Seminary
- Henry Shimer, entomologist and faculty at Mount Carroll Seminary
- Robert Shimer, macroeconomist
