= Pol Antràs =

Spanish economist

- Born: June 30, 1975 (age 51); Barcelona, Spain

Academic background
- Education: Pompeu Fabra University (BA, MSc); Massachusetts Institute of Technology (PhD)
- Doctoral advisor: Daron Acemoglu; Jaume Ventura

Academic work
- Discipline: International economics Macroeconomics
- Institutions: Harvard University
- Website: Information at IDEAS / RePEc

Pol Antràs Puchal (born June 30, 1975) is a Spanish economist who has served as the Robert G. Ory Professor of Economics at Harvard University since 2015.

Born in Barcelona in 1975, he received BA (1998) and MSc (1999) degrees in economics from Pompeu Fabra University, and a PhD in economics from the Massachusetts Institute of Technology in 2003. He has served since then on the faculty of Harvard University, and was appointed the Robert G. Ory Professor of Economics in 2015.

Antràs has been a research associate at the NBER since 2008, and directed its International Trade and Organization Working Group from 2007 to 2009. He is also a research affiliate at the Centre for Economic Policy Research, and is a member of CESifo’s Research Network. He was awarded an Alfred P. Sloan Research Fellowship in 2007 and the Fundación Banco Herrero Prize in 2009. He was elected a Fellow of the Econometric Society in 2015, and was elected to the American Academy of Arts and Sciences in 2024. He edited the Quarterly Journal of Economics from 2015 to 2020, and previously served on the editorial board of several other academic journals, including the American Economic Review, The Review of Economic Studies, the Journal of International Economics, and the Annual Review of Economics. Since 2022, he has served as a member of the Scientific Council of the Barcelona School of Economics.

== Early life and education ==
A Spanish citizen, Antràs grew up in Barcelona and attended the Aula Escola Europea from 1978 until 1993. As a schoolboy, he spent a year in New Mexico as an exchange student at the Albuquerque Academy. He studied economics at Pompeu Fabra University in Barcelona, receiving a BA in 1998 and an MSc in 1999, both with highest honours. He went on to graduate study at the Massachusetts Institute of Technology, where he received a PhD in economics in 2003, studying under Daron Acemoglu and Jaume Ventura.

== Research ==
Antràs is known for his work on international trade. He is particularly known for his contributions to the so-called "New" New Trade Theory, which stresses the importance of firms rather than sectors in understanding the challenges and the opportunities countries face in the age of globalization. In his 2003 Ph.D. thesis, Antràs developed a workhorse model of multinational firms and global sourcing that emphasizes the role of contractual frictions in shaping the international organization of production. Much of his early work on the topic is overviewed in his book Firms, Contracts and Trade Structure, published in 2019 by Princeton University Press.

More recently, his research has focused on understanding the emergence of global value chains. His work has specifically emphasized the sequential nature of certain production processes, and the implications of this sequentiality for the global sourcing decisions of firms, and for the implications of trade wars. Together with Davin Chor, he developed an influential model of global value chains, while also developing a widely used measure of the position (or upstreamness) of industries in global value chains. This work was the basis of his 2018 Ohlin Lecture at the Stockholm School of Economics.
