= James Kwak =

American businessman

- Born: 1969 (age 55–56); New York City, New York, U.S.
- Education: Harvard University (BA); University of California, Berkeley (MA, PhD); Yale University (JD)

James Kwak (born 1969) is an American lawyer and professor of law at the University of Connecticut School of Law. He is best known as co-founder, with Simon Johnson, in September 2008, of the economics blog "The Baseline Scenario", a commentary on developments in the global economy, law, and public policy.

== Career ==
Kwak received his A.B. magna cum laude in 1990 from Harvard University and his Ph.D. on French intellectual history in 1997 from the University of California, Berkeley (1997).

Kwak has worked as a consultant for McKinsey & Company and later was Director of Product Marketing at Ariba, where he led product strategy and marketing for the Platform Solutions division and the Ariba Network. He was a co-founder of Guidewire Software, an independent software vendor for the property and casualty insurance industry. After receiving his JD from Yale in 2011, he joined the faculty of the University of Connecticut School of Law in August 2011.

Kwak wrote the 2017 book Economism: Bad Economics and the Rise of Inequality (ISBN 978-1101871195). He co-wrote, with Simon Johnson, the 2010 book 13 Bankers: The Wall Street Takeover and the Next Financial Meltdown (ISBN 978-0307379054) and the 2012 book White House Burning: The Founding Fathers, Our National Debt, and Why It Matters to You (ISBN 978-0307906960). He is also an online columnist for The Atlantic.

In 2023, Kwak co-authored, with Stephen Bright the book The Fear of Too Much Justice: Race, Poverty, and the Persistence of Inequality in the Criminal Courts (ISBN 978-1620970256)
