= Guidewire Software =

American software company

Guidewire Software, Inc.

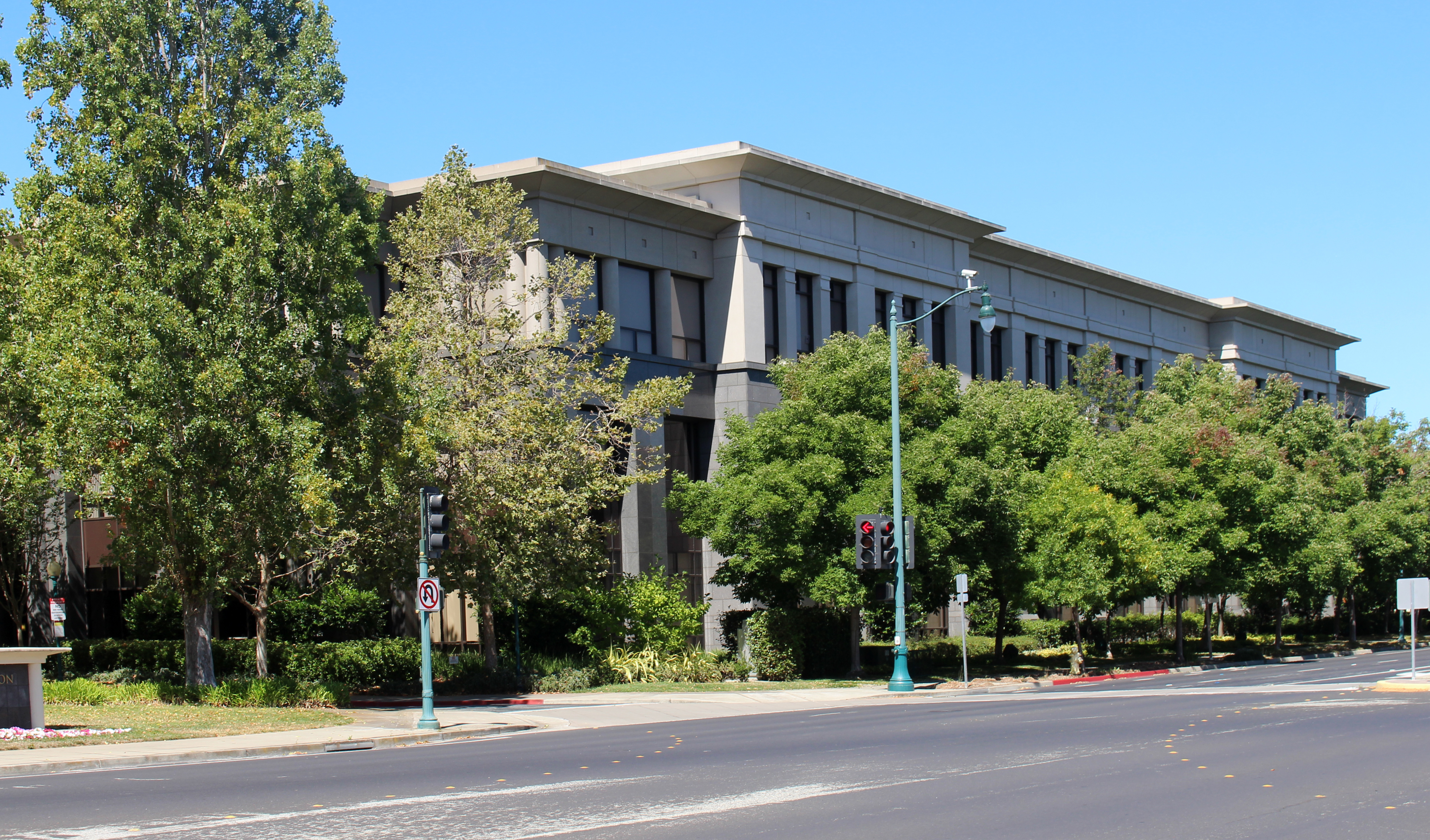
- Headquarters in San Mateo, California
- Type: Public
- Traded as: NYSE: GWRE; S&P 400 component
- Industry: P&C Insurance Software
- Founded: 2001; 25 years ago
- Founders: Marcus Ryu; John Seybold; Ken Branson; John Raguin; James Kwak; Mark Shaw
- Headquarters: San Mateo, California, U.S.
- Key people: Mike Rosenbaum (CEO); Michael Keller (Chairman)
- Products: InsuranceSuite (PolicyCenter, BillingCenter, ClaimCenter); InsuranceNow; Analytics (Predictive Analytics, Risk Insights, Business Intelligence); Guidewire Cloud
- Revenue: ▲US$1,202.5 million (2025)
- Net income: ▲US$69.8 million (2025)
- Number of employees: 3,772 (2025)
- Website: guidewire.com

Guidewire Software, Inc., commonly Guidewire, is an American software company based in San Mateo, California. It offers an industry platform for property and casualty (P&C) insurance carriers in the U.S. and worldwide.

== History ==
The company was established in 2001 and founded by: Ken Branson, James Kwak, John Raguin, and Marcus Ryu from Ariba (and McKinsey, where James and Marcus had met); and John Seybold and Mark Shaw from Kana Software. In September 2011, Guidewire filed with the SEC to raise up to $100 million in an initial public offering (IPO) and first publicly traded on the NYSE in January 2012. Guidewire was later cited as being one of the top IPOs of 2012, even #1.

In 2011, Guidewire settled a patent related lawsuit with Accenture regarding its claims management software.

In 2013, Guidewire acquired Millbrook, Inc., a business intelligence company. In 2016, Guidewire acquired ISCS (cloud computing), FirstBest (underwriting) and EagleEye Analytics. In 2017, Guidewire acquired Cyence, a data science and risk analytics company enabling P&C insurers to grow.

On August 5, 2019, Guidewire appointed Mike Rosenbaum as CEO.

In March 2023, Guidewire executed a sublease agreement to exchange headquarters with Roblox Corporation, another software company in San Mateo. Guidewire moved into and assumed the remaining lease term for the Roblox headquarters at 970 Park Place; Roblox assumed Guidewire's remaining lease term for Bay Meadows Station 2 at 2850 Delaware Street.

The company has been cited as being among the 50 most desirable mid-size Bay Area companies to work for, and was in the "Top 50 Large Companies" in Glassdoor's Best Places To Work. In June 2026, the company reported that its annual recurring revenue (ARR) surpassed $1.14 billion during the third quarter of fiscal year 2026, driven by continuous expansion of its cloud platform and subscription model.

== Products ==
Guidewire is a recurring revenue software company as it sells term licenses. The company also sells its software as a service on a subscription revenue basis. Its three main software products are ClaimCenter, PolicyCenter, and BillingCenter, each servicing a major component of a P&C insurance carrier. There are a number of add-on modules, as well as an increasing number of value-added online services provided via Guidewire Analytics and Guidewire Marketplace. Guidewire also develops the Gosu programming language.
