= Mark Aguiar =

American economist (born 1966)

- Born: 1966 (age 59–60)

Academic background
- Education: Massachusetts Institute of Technology (PhD); Brown University (BA)
- Doctoral advisor: Ricardo J. Caballero; Daron Acemoglu

Academic work
- Discipline: Macroeconomics; International economics
- Institutions: Princeton University; University of Rochester; University of Chicago
- Website: Information at IDEAS / RePEc

Mark Armando Aguiar (born 1966) is an American economist who has served as the Walker Professor of Economics and International Finance at Princeton University since 2015.

== Education ==
Born in 1966, Aguiar graduated magna cum laude from Brown University with a BA in history and Chinese in 1988. Whilst at Brown, he studied the Chinese language for a term at Nankai University in Tianjin in 1987. From 1989 to 1995, he was a Foreign Service officer at the Department of State, serving in Seoul, Beijing, and the Office of Japanese Affairs in Washington, DC. He then went on to graduate study at the Massachusetts Institute of Technology, where he received a PhD in economics in 1999, writing a thesis titled The Information Content of Asset Prices and Emerging Market Crises under the direction of Ricardo J. Caballero and Daron Acemoglu.

== Career ==
Aguiar was an assistant professor of economics at the University of Chicago Booth School of Business between 1999 and 2004, a senior economist at the Federal Reserve Bank of Boston from 2004 to 2006, and a tenured associate professor of economics at the University of Rochester from 2006 to 2011. He became a professor of economics at Princeton University in 2011, where he was appointed the Walker Professor of Economics and International Finance in 2015, and has directed the International Economics Section since 2021.

Aguiar is a research associate at the NBER, and has directed its Program in International Finance and Macroeconomics since 2022. He was elected a Fellow of the Econometric Society in 2018, and was a co-editor of the American Economic Review from 2014 to 2017, where he previously served on the board of editors and reviewed submissions relating to macroeconomics. Aguiar has been a member of the advisory board of the Carnegie-NYU-Rochester Conference on Public Policy since 2010. In 2017, The Economist commented on research he conducted (alongside Mark Bils, Kerwin Charles, and Erik Hurst) on the link between unemployment and ownership of video game consoles.
