= İsmail Özdağlar =

Turkish politician (born 1950)

State Minister
- In office December 13, 1983 – February 24, 1986
- Prime Minister: Turgut Özal

Personal details
- Born: September 17, 1950 (age 76) Demirci, Manisa Province, Turkey
- Party: Motherland Party (ANAP)
- Children: 2, including Asuman Özdağlar
- Education: Middle East Technical University; Indiana University; University of Michigan

İsmail Özdağlar (born September 17, 1950) is a Turkish politician and former government minister. He was convicted of misuse of ministerial powers.

== Early life ==
İsmail Özdağlar was born to Ali Özdağlar and his wife Akile in Demirci town of Manisa Province on September 17, 1950. He was educated in mechanical engineering at Middle East Technical University in Ankara. He completed his postgraduate studies at Indiana University and University of Michigan, USA.

He served as the executive at Taksan Co. before he entered politics.

== Politics career ==
Ismail Özdağlar joined the newly established Motherland Party (ANAP), which came out as the majority party from the 1983 general election held on November 6. He was elected into the parliament representing his hometown Manisa. Prime minister Turgut Özal took İsmail Özdağlar into his cabinet formed on December 13, 1983 appointing him as State minister responsible for petroleum supply.

In 1985, rumors circulated about Özdağlar's involvement in corruption. He was accused of allowing shipping of petroleum to a higher cost than usual, and sharing the difference with the shipowner. It was claimed that Özdağlar received 25 million Turkish lira as part of the bribe. As it came to Prime minister Özal's notice, he immediately started a covered investigation by tasking his advisor Adnan Kahveci to bring evidence to him. Kahveci, a technology freak, secretly recorded the conversation on the bribery between Özdağlar and shipowner Uğur Mengenecioğlu using a cassette recorder, and submitted the voice tape to Özal. After listening to the recording tape several times, Özal ordered Özdağlar to his residence, and asked him to resign from the minister post when he managed Özdağlar to confess the crime.

39 ANAP deputies in the parliament submitted a motion to investigate the corruption case. On May 15, 1985, 311 of the total 400 deputies of the parliament voted in favor of a proposal to send Özdağlar before the Constitutional Court (Turkish: Yüce Divan) for trial. The trial began on May 21, 1985. İsmail Özdağlar stood trial along with his father Ali Özdağlar and his brother-in-law Mehmet Kaymak, who were actively involved in the corruption. Even Özal testified in the court against Özdağlar. The supreme court concluded on February 14, 1986 that İsmail Özdağlar is guilty of malpractice, and sentenced him to two years in prison, a fine of 30,000 Turkish lira, a two-year ban from employment in state service and in addition the payment of trial expenses amounting to 281,410 Turkish lira. He was exempted from charges for bribery.

On February 24, 1986, Özdağlar announced his resignation. On March 5, 1986, he was stripped of his parliamentary immunity. He was acquitted of bribe charges, but convicted on misuse of ministerial powers. After serving nine months and eighteen days in prison, he was released on December 30, 1986.

== Family life ==
Özdağlar is married to Zahide. They have a son, Mehmet, and a daughter, Asuman Özdağlar (b. 1974), who is a professor of Electrical Engineering and Computer Science at MIT and is married to economist Daron Acemoglu.
