= Ufuk Akcigit =

Turkish Economist

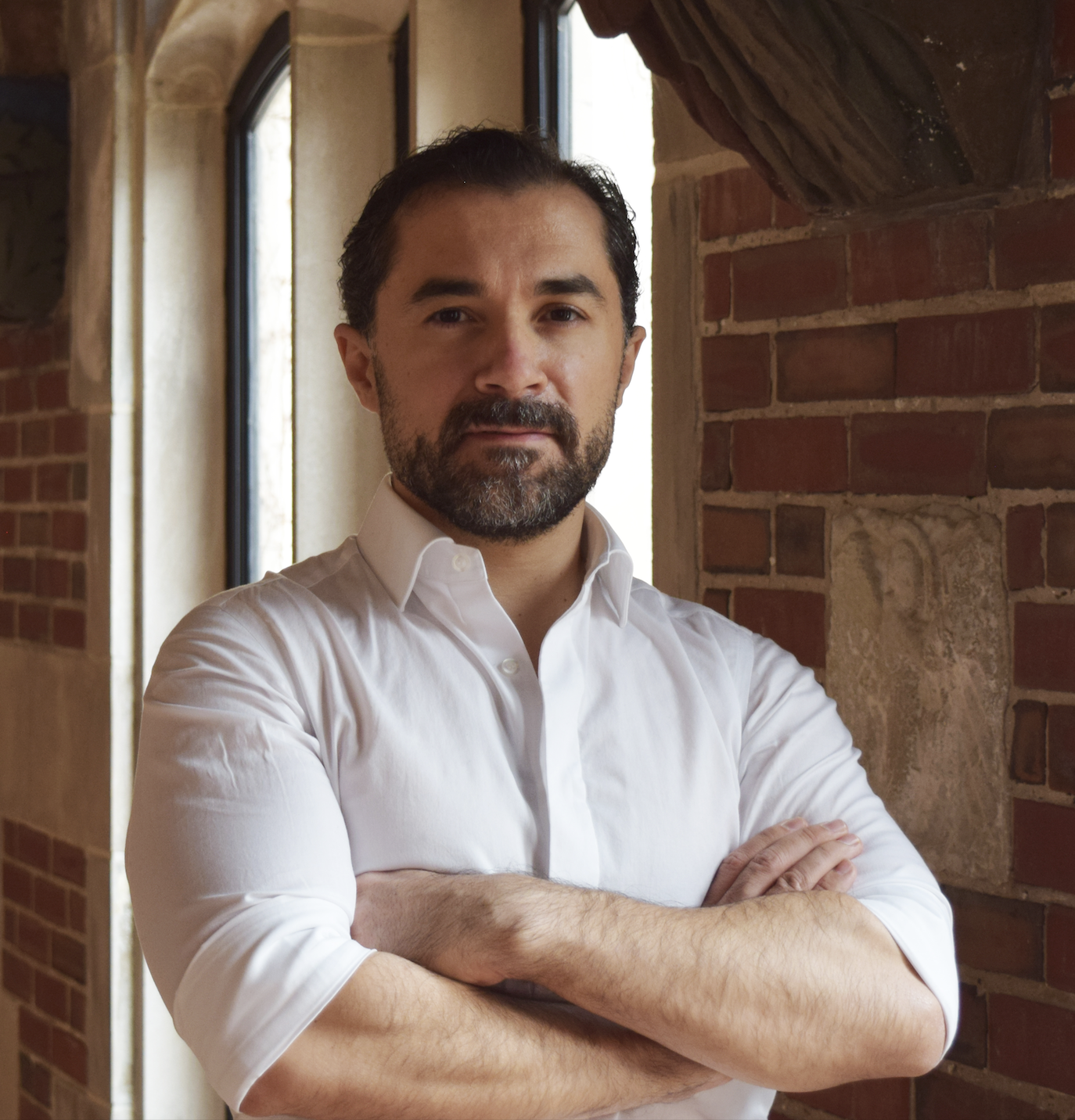
- Born: May 23, 1980 (age 46); Germany

Academic background
- Education: MIT (PhD); Koc University (BA)
- Doctoral advisor: Daron Acemoglu
- Website: www.ufukakcigit.com

Ufuk Akcigit (born 23 May 1980) is a Turkish economist. In 2020, he was named the Arnold C. Harberger Professor of Economics at the University of Chicago, the Kenneth C. Griffin Department of Economics. His research concentrates on economic growth and development, and uses an interdisciplinary approach blending micro and macro economic concepts to examine the intersection of policy and innovation.

His work has been widely published in the top economic journals and has been recognized by a number of awards and honors within the field of economics.

== Early life and education ==
Ufuk Akcigit was born to Turkish parents in Germany. He lived in Germany until he was four years old and his parents relocated to their hometown of Bursa.

He was interested in Mathematics and Economics from an early age and completed middle and high school at Ankara Anatolian High School. In 2003, he obtained his bachelor's degree in economics from Koç University after which, he pursued his doctoral studies at the economics department of Massachusetts Institute of Technology (MIT). He earned a Ph.D. degree in 2009 with his dissertation: Essays on growth and innovation policies.

His thesis adviser was Daron Acemoğlu, with whom he has since collaborated.

== Academic career ==
After his doctoral studies, Akcigit began working as an assistant professor at the University of Pennsylvania. In 2015, he joined the University of Chicago as an assistant professor, was promoted to associate professor in 2018 and then to a full Professor in 2019. In 2020 he was named the Arnold C. Harberger Professor in Economics and the college.

As part of his work at the University of Chicago, Akcigit founded the Akcigit Research Team (ART). This research group runs as a lab, using large-scale firm and individual level micro datasets to uncover how talent allocation, human capital, industrial policies, competitive landscape, academia, and institutions influence economic growth through innovation and ideas.^{[6]} As winner of the Max Planck-Humboldt Research Award, Akcigit also manages a dedicated research team in Germany that focuses on the Economic Gap between East and West Germany.

Akcigit's research has been acknowledged with a number of roles and awards. In 2016 he was named Distinguished Research Fellow by Koç University. In 2021, Akcigit was named Econometric Society Fellow and John Simon Guggenheim Fellow. In 2022, he received the Global Economy Prize in Economics from the Kiel Institute in Germany and the Sakıp Sabancı International Research Award. In 2025, Akcikit was awarded the prestigious Rahmi M. Koç Medal of Science for his pioneering contributions to the field of economics, particularly for his theoretical and empirical research on innovation, productivity, entrepreneurship, income distribution and social mobility.

Akcigit currently holds Research Associate positions at the National Bureau of Economic Research, Center for Economic Policy Research, Brookings Institution, Halle Institute, Rimini Centre for Economic Analysis, and CESifo.

== Research ==
As a macroeconomist, Akcigit's research focuses on understanding the links between innovation and policies to support economic growth. He is a pioneer in the field of quantitative economic growth, which combines economic models with micro-level data. His research focuses on three main aspects that connect innovation and aggregate economic growth: firms, inventors, and ideas.

In his research on firms, Akcigit has focused on different types of innovations, and the quality of these innovations have important economic growth implications. Looking at the life cycle of firms and innovation in developing countries, his work demonstrates that these countries suffer from low creative destruction. He also studies the interplay of taxation and innovation, uncovering what incentives governments provide to firms to innovate using taxes and subsidies.

As part of his contributions to the concept of creative destruction, Akcigit examines inventors themselves to uncover their incentives to innovate and their effect on society. He focuses on modern-time inventors, historical inventors, and their interactions in society. In this research, he investigates the factors determining who becomes an inventor and uncovers that IQ, education and parental background are key ingredients.

Akcigit also focuses on how ideas are generated and how they are materialized. He argues that ideas are not necessarily born to the best users to ensure utilization; an established patent system is crucial for idea transformation. He uses large scale datasets such as social security records, firm balance sheets and patent microdata to advance his research.

Taking a step back to look at the business dynamism and market dynamics themselves, Akcigit argues that upon decreased knowledge diffusion, corporate market power has risen in recent decades. This resulted in an increased corporate market power and market concentration. He then examines how firms respond to these changing dynamics in the economy. He uses firm and state-based micro data to uncover these effects. With a group of researches from the International Monetary Fund, Akcigit investigated these issues across different countries, publishing their findings on a report entitled "Rising Corporate Market Power: Emerging Policy Issues".

Finally, he focuses on income inequality arguing that innovation is positively correlated with the former. He uses cross-state panel U.S. Data to work on income inequality and social mobility.

== Publications ==
The Economics of Creative Destruction (2021)

In 2021, Akcigit co-authored the anthology The Economics of Creative Destruction (2021) with John Van Reenen. The book is a comprehensive examination of the concept of creative destruction in economics. Building on the work of Austrian economist Joseph Schumpeter, the book explores how innovation, entrepreneurship, and technological progress drive the renewal of industries, displacing outdated models and fostering economic growth. Featuring contributions from economists, it delves into the mechanics of how creative destruction shapes markets, firms, and broader economic systems. The book also critically assesses the impact of innovation on employment, productivity, and societal well-being, offering insights into how economies adapt to and benefit from transformative change.

World Development Report (2024)

Akcigit served as the Academic Lead for the World Development Report 2024. That year's report, The Middle-Income Trap, identified what developing economies can do to avoid the "middle-income trap." As part of this report, Akcigit collaborated with the World Bank to launch the Growth Academy and a subsequent center, the Global Center for Economic Growth, at the University of Chicago that will continue to investigate the roles that creative destruction can play in supporting economic growth in developing countries.

Awards

- Econometric Society Fellow
- John Simon Guggenheim Fellow
- Kauffman Junior Faculty Fellow
- Rahmi M. Koç Medal of Science (2025)
- Kiel Institute Global Economy Prize in Economics (2022)
- Sakıp Sabancı International Research Award (2022)
- Max Planck-Humboldt Research Award (2019)
- Asaf Savas Akat Economics Prize (2019)
- CAREER Award, National Science Foundation (2017)
- Kiel Institute Excellence Award in Global Economic Affairs (2016)

== Selected bibliography ==
- Akcigit, U., Celik, M. A., & Greenwood, J. (2016). Buy, Keep, or Sell: Economic Growth and the Market for Ideas. Econometrica, 84(3), 943–984. https://doi.org/10.3982/ecta12144
- Acemoglu, D., Akcigit, U., Alp, H., Bloom, N., & Kerr, W. (2018). Innovation, Reallocation and Growth. American Economic Review, 108(11), 3450 – 3491. https://doi.org/10.3386/w18993
- Akcigit, U., Baslandze, S., & Stantcheva, S. (2015). Taxation and the International Mobility of Inventors. American Economic Review, 106(10), 2930- 2981. https://doi.org/10.3386/w21024
- Akcigit, U., Hanley, D., & Serrano-Velarde, N. (2021). Back to basics: Basic Research Spillovers, Innovation Policy and Growth, Review of Economic Studies, 88(1), 1-43. https://doi.org/10.3386/w19473
- Akcigit, U., Alp, H., & Peters, M. (2021). Lack of selection and limits to delegation: Firm Dynamics in Developing Countries, American Economic Review, 111(1), 231- 275. https://doi.org/10.3386/w21905
- Akcigit U., Grigsby J., Nicholas T., Stantcheva S. (2021). Taxation and Innovation in the 20th Century, Quarterly Journal of Economics. https://doi.org/10.1093/qje/qjab022
- Aghion P., Akcigit U., Deaton A., Roulet A. (2016). Creative Destruction and Subjective Well-Being. American Economic Review. 106(12) 3869- 3897. https://doi.org/10.3386/w21069
- Akcigit U., Ates S. (2021). Ten Facts on Declining Business Dynamism and Lessons from Endogenous Growth Theory. American Economic Journal: Macroeconomics. 13(1), 257- 298. https://doi.org/10.1257/mac.20180449
- Aghion P., Akcigit U., Blundell A., Hemous D. (2019), Innovation and Top Income Inequality. Review of Economic Studies. 86(1), 1- 45. https://doi.org/10.1093/restud/rdy027
