= 13 Bankers =

2010 book by Simon Johnson and James Kwak

13 Bankers: The Wall Street Takeover and the Next Financial Meltdown
- Author: Simon Johnson, James Kwak
- Subject: Economics, 2008 financial crisis
- Publisher: Pantheon Books
- Publication date: March 30, 2010
- Pages: 320
- ISBN: 978-0-307-37905-4
- OCLC: 699842864

13 Bankers: The Wall Street Takeover and the Next Financial Meltdown is a 2010 book written by economist Simon Johnson and historian James Kwak. According to economist C. Fred Bergsten, the book offers an analysis of the 2008 financial crisis.
