= Family planning in the United States =

The objective of family planning in the United States is to enable individuals to determine the number and spacing of their children and to select the means by which that target may be achieved. Doing so can bring many benefits including improved maternal health, the prevention of the spread of STDs, and decreased infant and child mortality rates.

== Federally Funded Programs ==
=== Planned Parenthood ===
Teenage pregnancies are very involved in today's society and because of this the resources that are around for family planning is vital to the survival of these infants. Federally funded programs such as Planned Parenthood are very important in the family planning process of adolescents because of the involvement of doctors, gynecologists, or medicine. These family planning practices also help impact the teenager and the infant because of the availability of healthcare and other resources that may otherwise not be offered.

=== Title X ===
Title X of the Public Health Service Act, is a US government program dedicated to providing family planning services for those in need. But funding for Title X as a percentage of total public funding to family planning client services has steadily declined from 44% of total expenditures in 1980 to 12% in 2006.

=== Medicaid ===
Medicaid has increased from 20% to 71% in the same time. In 2006, Medicaid contributed $1.3 billion to public family planning. The 1.9 billion spent on publicly funded family planning in 2008 saved an estimated $7 billion in short term Medicaid costs. Such services helped women prevent an estimated 1.94 million unintended pregnancies and 810,000 abortions.

More than 3 out of 10 women in the U.S. have an abortion by the time they are 45 years old.

== Contraceptive use in family planning ==
In the United States, contraceptive use saves about $19 billion in direct medical costs each year. Despite the availability of highly effective contraceptives, about half of the pregnancies in the United States are unintended. Highly effective contraceptives, such as IUD are underused in the United States. Increasing use of highly effective contraceptives could help meet the goal set forward in Healthy People 2020 to decrease unintended pregnancy by 10%. Cost to the user is one factor preventing many US women from using more effective contraceptives. Making contraceptives available without a copay increases use of highly effective methods, reduces unintended pregnancies, and may be instrumental in achieving the Healthy People 2020 goal.

== See also ==
- Birth control in the United States
- Abortion in the United States
- Human population planning
