= Daron Acemoglu =

Turkish-American economist (born 1967)

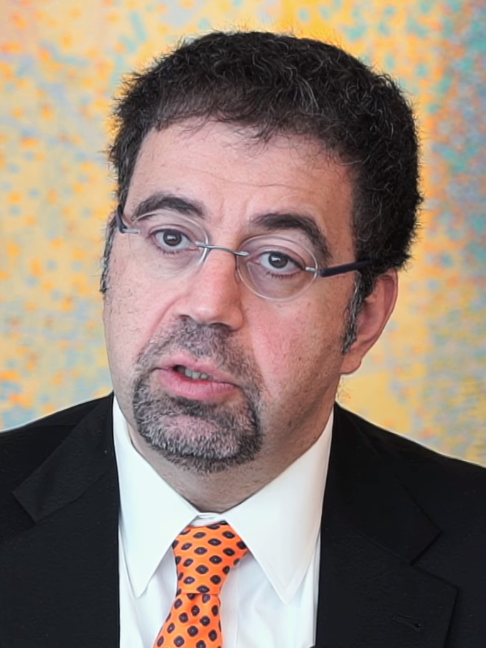
- Acemoglu in 2016
- Born: Kamer Daron Acemoğlu; September 3, 1967 (age 59); Kadıköy, Istanbul, Turkey
- Citizenship: Turkey; United States
- Spouse: Asu Ozdaglar

Academic background
- Education: University of York (BA); London School of Economics (MSc, PhD)
- Thesis: Essays in Microfoundations of Macroeconomics: Contracts and Macroeconomic Performance (1992)
- Doctoral advisor: Kevin W. S. Roberts
- Influences: Joel Mokyr; Kenneth Sokoloff; Douglass North; Seymour Martin Lipset; Barrington Moore

Academic work
- Discipline: Political economy Economic growth Development economics Labour economics
- School or tradition: New institutional economics
- Institutions: London School of Economics (1989–1993); Massachusetts Institute of Technology (1993–present)
- Doctoral students: Robert Shimer; Mark Aguiar; Pol Antràs; Gabriel Carroll; Melissa Dell; Benjamin Jones; Ufuk Akcigit
- Awards: John Bates Clark Medal (2005); John von Neumann Award (2007); Erwin Plein Nemmers Prize in Economics (2012); BBVA Foundation Frontiers of Knowledge Award (2016); Nobel Memorial Prize in Economic Sciences (2024)
- Website: Information at IDEAS / RePEc

Kamer Daron Acemoğlu (Note: Turkish: [daˈɾon aˈdʒemoːɫu]; Armenian: Տարոն Աճեմօղլու) (born September 3, 1967) is a Turkish-American economist of Armenian descent who has been at the Massachusetts Institute of Technology since 1993, where he is currently the Elizabeth and James Killian Professor of Economics. He was named an Institute Professor at MIT in 2019. His primary research fields include political economy, development economics, and labor economics. He received the John Bates Clark Medal in 2005, and the Nobel Memorial Prize in Economic Sciences in 2024.

Acemoglu ranked third, behind Paul Krugman and Greg Mankiw, in the list of "Favorite Living Economists Under Age 60" in a 2011 survey among American economists. In 2015, he was named the most cited economist of the past 10 years per Research Papers in Economics (RePEc) data. According to the Open Syllabus Project, Acemoglu is the third most frequently cited author on college syllabi for economics courses after Mankiw and Krugman.

In 2024, Acemoglu, Simon Johnson, and James A. Robinson were awarded the Nobel Memorial Prize in Economic Sciences for their comparative studies in prosperity between states and empires. He is regarded as a centrist with a focus on institutions, poverty and econometrics.

== Early and personal life ==
Kamer Daron Acemoğlu (Note: Western Armenian: Տարօն Աճէմօղլու. Acemoğlu is the Turkified version of the Armenian last name Ajemian (Աճէմեան). Its root derives from the Arabic term ajam, used for non-Arabs, especially Persians. Most of Turkey's Armenians changed their last names due to the 1934 Surname Law. His first name is the Western Armenian version of Taron, a male given name from a historic region.) was born in Istanbul to Armenian parents on September 3, 1967. His father, Kevork Acemoglu (1938–1988), was a commercial lawyer and lecturer at Istanbul University. His mother, Irma Acemoglu (d. 1991), was a poet and the principal of Aramyan Uncuyan, an Armenian elementary school in Kadıköy, which he attended, before graduating from Galatasaray High School in 1986. He became interested in politics and economics as a teenager.

He was educated at the University of York, where he received a BA in economics in 1989, and at the London School of Economics (LSE), where he received an MSc in econometrics and mathematical economics in 1990, and a PhD in economics in 1992. His doctoral thesis was titled Essays in Microfoundations of Macroeconomics: Contracts and Economic Performance. His doctoral advisor was Kevin W. S. Roberts. James Malcomson, one of his doctoral examiners at the LSE, said that even the weakest three of the seven chapters of his thesis were "more than sufficient for the award of a PhD." Arnold Kling called him a wunderkind due to the fact that he received his PhD by the time he was 25.

Acemoglu is a naturalized US citizen. He is fluent in English and Turkish, and speaks some Armenian. He is married to Asuman "Asu" Ozdağlar, a professor of electrical engineering and computer science at MIT, who is the daughter of İsmail Özdağlar, a former Turkish government minister. Together, they have authored several articles. As of 2015, they live in Newton, Massachusetts, with their two sons, Arda and Aras.

== Academic career ==
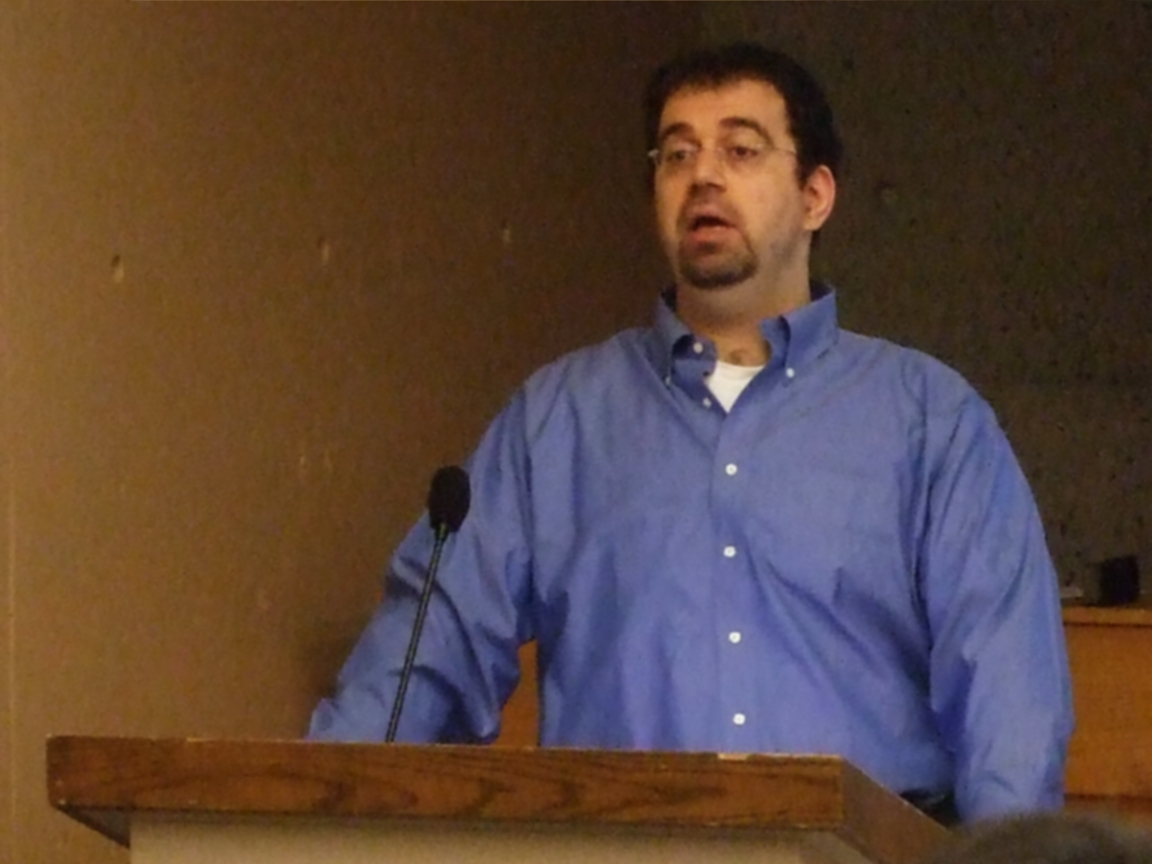
Acemoglu in 2009

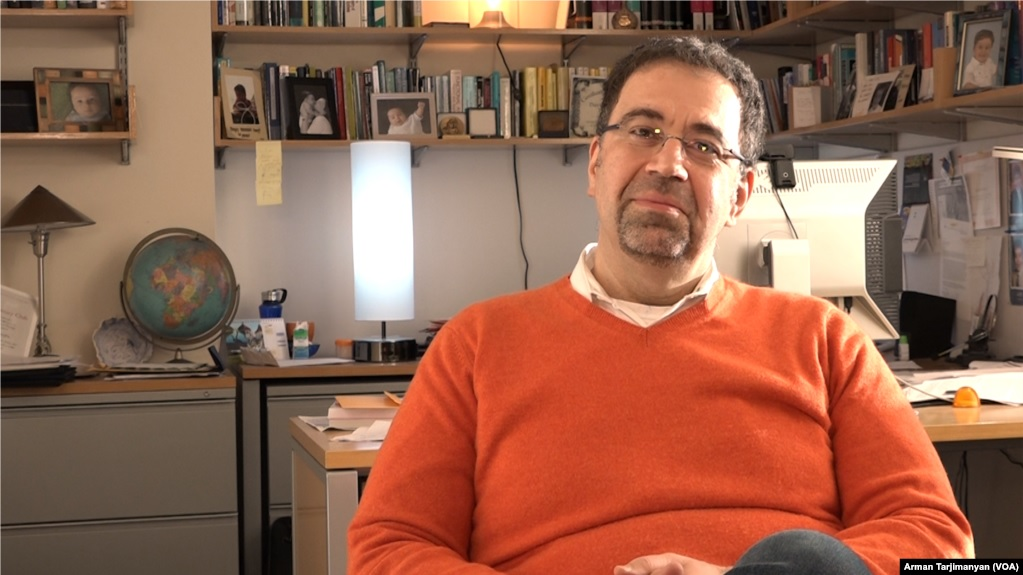
Acemoglu in his office, January 2020

Acemoglu was a lecturer in economics at the London School of Economics from 1992 to 1993. He was appointed an assistant professor at MIT in 1993, where he became the Pentti Kouri Associate Professor of Economics in 1997, and was tenured in 1998. He became a full professor at MIT in 2000, and served as the Charles P. Kindleberger Professor of Applied Economics there from 2004 to 2010. In 2010, Acemoglu was appointed the Elizabeth and James Killian Professor of Economics at MIT. In July 2019, he was named an Institute Professor, the highest faculty honor at MIT.

As of 2019, he has mentored over 60 PhD students. Among his doctoral students are Ufuk Akçiġit, Robert Shimer, Mark Aguiar, Pol Antràs, and Gabriel Carroll. In 2014, he made $841,380, making him one of the top earners at MIT.

Acemoglu is a research associate at the National Bureau of Economic Research (NBER), and was elected a Fellow of the Econometric Society in 2005. He was elected to the American Academy of Arts and Sciences in 2006, and to the National Academy of Sciences in 2014. He is also a Senior Fellow at the Canadian Institute for Advanced Research, and a member of several other learned societies. He edited Econometrica, an academic journal published by the Econometric Society, from 2011 to 2015. Acemoglu was appointed to the United Nations Secretary-General's Scientific Advisory Board and was formally welcomed as a new member at the board's June 2026 meeting in Turin.

Acemoglu has authored hundreds of academic papers. He noted that most of his research has been "motivated by trying to understand the sources of poverty." His research includes a wide range of topics, including political economy, human capital theory, growth theory, economic development, innovation, labor economics, income and wage inequality, and network economics, among others. He noted in 2011 that most his research of the past 15 years concerned with what can be broadly called political economy. He has made contribution to the labor economics field.

Acemoglu has extensively collaborated with James A. Robinson, a British political scientist and his peer at the London School of Economics. Acemoglu has described it as a "very productive relationship." They have worked together on many articles and books, most of which are on the subject of growth and economic development. The two have also extensively collaborated with economist Simon Johnson.

== Research and publications ==
Acemoglu is considered a follower of new institutional economics. His influences include Joel Mokyr, Kenneth Sokoloff, Douglass North, Seymour Martin Lipset, and Barrington Moore.

=== Books ===
==== Economic Origins of Dictatorship and Democracy ====
Published by Cambridge University Press in 2006, Economic Origins of Dictatorship and Democracy by Acemoglu and Robinson analyzes the creation and consolidation of democratic societies. They argue that "democracy consolidates when elites do not have a strong incentive to overthrow it. These processes depend on (1) the strength of civil society, (2) the structure of political institutions, (3) the nature of political and economic crises, (4) the level of economic inequality, (5) the structure of the economy, and (6) the form and extent of globalization." The book's title is derived from Social Origins of Dictatorship and Democracy, a 1966 book by Barrington Moore Jr.

Romain Wacziarg praised the book and argued that its substantive contribution is the theoretical fusion of the Marxist dialectical materialism ("institutional change results from distributional struggles between two distinct social groups, a rich ruling class and a poor majority, each of whose interests are shaped primarily by economic forces") and the ideas of Barry Weingast and Douglass North, who argued that "institutional reform can be a way for the elite to credibly commit to future policies by delegating their enactment to interests that will not wish to reverse them." William Easterly called it "one of the most important contributions to the literature on the economics of democracy in a long time." Edward Glaeser described it as "enormously significant" work and a "great contribution to the field."

==== Why Nations Fail ====
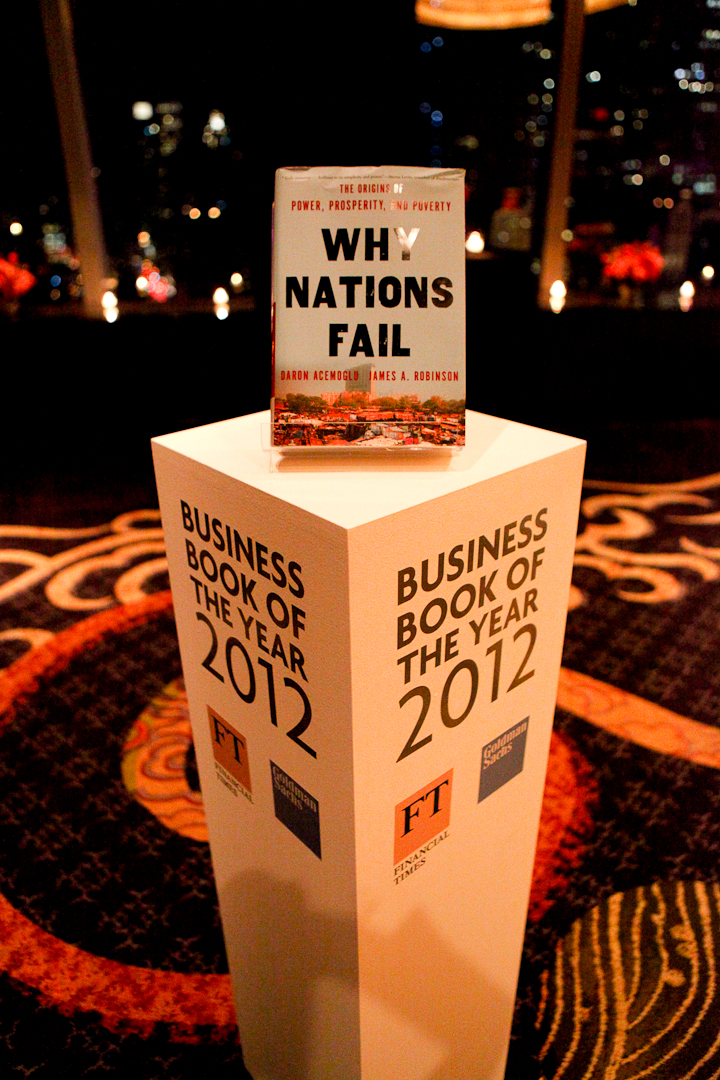
Why Nations Fail was included in the Shortlist of the 2012 Financial Times Business Book of the Year Award.

In their 2012 book, Why Nations Fail, Acemoglu and Robinson argue that economic growth at the forefront of technology requires political stability, which the Mayan civilization (to name only one) did not have, and creative destruction. The latter cannot occur without institutional restraints on the granting of monopoly and oligopoly rights. They say that the Industrial Revolution began in Great Britain, because the English Bill of Rights 1689 created such restraints.

Acemoglu and Robinson insist that "development differences across countries are exclusively due to differences in political and economic institutions, and reject other theories that attribute some of the differences to culture, weather, geography or lack of knowledge about the best policies and practices." For example, "Soviet Russia generated rapid growth as it caught up rapidly with some of the advanced technologies in the world [but] was running out of steam by the 1970s" because of a lack of creative destruction.

The book was written for a general audience. It was widely discussed by political analysts and commentators. Warren Bass wrote of it in The Washington Post: "bracing, garrulous, wildly ambitious and ultimately hopeful. It may, in fact, be a bit of a masterpiece."

Clive Crook wrote in Bloomberg News that the book deserves most of the "lavish praise" it received. In his review in Foreign Affairs Jeffrey Sachs criticized Acemoglu and Robinson for systematically ignoring factors such as domestic politics, geopolitics, technological discoveries, and natural resources. He also argued that the book's appeal was based on readers' desire to hear that "Western democracy pays off not only politically but also economically." Bill Gates called the book a "major disappointment" and characterized the authors' analysis as "vague and simplistic." Ryan Avent, an editor at The Economist, responded that "Acemoglu and Robinson might not be entirely right about why nations succeed or fail. But at least they're engaged with the right problem."

==== The Narrow Corridor ====
In The Narrow Corridor. States, Societies, and the Fate of Liberty (2019), Acemoglu and Robinson argue that a free society is attained when the power of the state and of society evolved in rough balance. The book introduces the concept of the "red queen effect," which suggests that liberty is maintained only when both the state and society continually evolve to keep each other in check.

==== Power and Progress ====
Published in 2023, Power and Progress: Our Thousand-Year Struggle Over Technology and Prosperity is a book by Acemoglu and Simon Johnson on the historical development of technology and the social and political consequences of technology. The book addresses three questions, on the relationship between new machines and production techniques and wages, on the way in which technology could be harnessed for social goods, and on the reason for the enthusiasm around artificial intelligence.

Power and Progress argues that technologies do not automatically yield social goods, their benefits going to a narrow elite. It offers a rather critical view of artificial intelligence (AI), stressing its largely negative impact on jobs and wages and on democracy.

Acemoglu and Johnson also provide a vision of how new technologies could be harnessed for social good. They see the Progressive Era as offering a model. They also discuss a list of policy proposals for the redirection of technology that includes: (1) market incentives, (2) the break up of big tech, (3) tax reform, (4) investing in workers, (5) privacy protection and data ownership, and (6) a digital advertising tax.

=== Papers ===
==== Social programs and policies ====
In a 2001 article, Acemoglu argued that the minimum wage and unemployment benefits "shift the composition of employment toward high-wage jobs. Because the composition of jobs in the laissez-faire equilibrium is inefficiently biased toward low-wage jobs, these labor market regulations increase average labor productivity and may improve welfare." Furthermore, he has argued that "minimum wages can increase training of affected workers, by inducing firms to train their unskilled employees."

==== Democracy and economy ====
Acemoglu et al. found that "democracy has a significant and robust positive effect on GDP" and suggested that "democratizations increase GDP per capita by about 20% in the long run." In another paper, Acemoglu et al. found that "there is a significant and robust effect of democracy on tax revenues as a fraction of GDP, but no robust impact on inequality.". The authors argue that democratic institutions contribute to economic growth by expanding education, improving public capacity, and encouraging investment.

==== Social democracy and unions ====
Acemoglu and Philippe Aghion argued in 2001 that although deunionization in the US and UK since the 1980s is not the "underlying cause of the increase in inequality", it "amplifies the direct effect of skill-biased technical change by removing the wage compression imposed by unions."

According to Acemoglu and Robinson, unions historically had a significant role in creating democracy, especially in western Europe, and in maintaining a balance of political power between established business interests and political elites.

==== Nordic model ====
In a 2012 paper titled "Can't We All Be More Like Scandinavians?", co-written with Robinson and Verdier, he suggests that "it may be precisely the more 'cutthroat' American society that makes possible the more 'cuddly' Scandinavian societies based on a comprehensive social safety net, the welfare state and more limited inequality." They concluded that "all countries may want to be like the 'Scandinavians' with a more extensive safety net and a more egalitarian structure," however, if the United States shifted from being a "cutthroat [capitalism] leader", the economic growth of the entire world would be reduced. He argued against the US adopting the Nordic model in a 2015 op-ed for The New York Times. He again argued: "If the US increased taxation to Denmark levels, it would reduce rewards for entrepreneurship, with negative consequences for growth and prosperity." He praised the Scandinavian experience in poverty reduction, creation of a level playing field for its citizens, and higher social mobility. This was critiqued by Lane Kenworthy, who argues that, empirically, the US's economic growth preceded the divergence in 'cutthroat' and 'cuddly' policies, and there is no relationship between inequality and innovation for developed countries.

==== Colonialism ====
"The Colonial Origins of Comparative Development", co-written by Acemoglu, Robinson, and Simon Johnson in 2001, is by far his most cited work. Graham Mallard described it as an "excellent example of his work: an influential paper that has led to much debate." They argue that Europeans set up extractive institutions in colonies where they did not settle, unlike in places where they did settle and that these institutions have persisted. They estimated that "differences in institutions explain approximately three-quarters of the income per capita differences across former colonies." Historical experience dominated by extractive institutions in these countries has created a vicious circle, which was exacerbated by European colonization.

==== A critique of modernization theory ====
Daron Acemoglu and James A. Robinson, in their article "Income and Democracy" (2008) show that even though there is a strong cross-country correlation between income and democracy, once one controls for country fixed effects and removes the association between income per capita and various measures of democracy, there is "no causal effect of income on democracy." In "Non-Modernization" (2022), they further argue that modernization theory cannot account for various paths of political development "because it posits a link between economics and politics that is not conditional on institutions and culture and that presumes a definite endpoint—for example, an 'end of history'."

==== Automation and labor markets ====
Beginning in the late 2010s, Acemoglu expanded his research to focus on the economic effects of automation and artificial intelligence on labor markets. In collaboration with Pascual Restrepo, he examined how industrial robots affected employment and wages in the United States. Their study "Robots and Jobs: Evidence from U.S. Labor Markets" (2020) found that regions with greater exposure to industrial robots experienced larger declines in employment and modest reductions in wages, suggesting that the economic benefits of automation were not evenly distributed. Acemoglu and Restrepo extended this analysis in "Tasks, Automation, and the Rise in U.S. Wage Inequality" (2022), arguing that automation has contributed to rising wage inequality in the United States by replacing many middle-skill tasks while increasing demand for higher-skill labor. This body of research has influenced broader discussions on the future of work, emphasizing that technological change does not automatically benefit workers and can lead to unequal outcomes if incentives favor labor-replacing technologies. Acemoglu has argued that policy and institutional frameworks play an important role in determining whether new technologies complement human labor or substitute for it.

== Views ==
Journalists and economists have described Acemoglu as a centrist. (Note: "... the middle-of-the-roaders Daron Acemoglu and James Robinson ..." "Daron Acemoglu, a more centrist economist at MIT ..." "... Acemoglu, who aligns more with the center than with the populists.") Why Nations Fail was well received by both liberal and conservative economists. Acemoglu's and Robinson's long-time collaborator Simon Johnson suggests that their "point is not just about how things may become awful when the government goes off track (a right-leaning point). They are also more deeply concerned about how powerful people fight to grab control of the state and otherwise compete to exert influence over the rest of society (a left-leaning perspective)."

Acemoglu has praised the successes of the Progressive Era, and argued in favor of its replication. He argues that the market economy is the only system that creates prosperity, and believes in finding an appropriate balance between "incentivizing creativity, hard work and risk-taking and creating the essential public services, social safety nets and equality of opportunity." For Acemoglu, markets work only with regulations and predictable laws and that all markets are regulated to some extent; it is only a matter of degree. He suggests that free markets are not unregulated markets.

=== Wall Street ===
In September 2008, Acemoglu signed a petition condemning the Bush administration's bailout plan for the US financial system. As the main cause of the 2008 financial crisis, he stated that policy makers were "lured by ideological notions derived from Ayn Rand's novels rather than economic theory" and opined: "In hindsight, we should not be surprised that unregulated profit-seeking individuals have taken risks from which they benefit and others lose." In an early analysis of the Great Recession, Acemoglu wrote: "When channeled into profit-maximizing, competitive, and innovative behavior under the auspices of sound laws and regulations, greed can act as the engine of innovation and economic growth. But when unchecked by the appropriate institutions and regulations, it will degenerate into rent-seeking, corruption, and crime." He argues that the heavy overrepresentation from the financial sector in the top 1% "has been an outcome of the political processes that have removed all of the regulations in finance, and so created the platform for 40 percent of U.S. corporate profits to be in the financial sector." He argues that a platform, particularly in Wall Street, has been created "where the ambition and greed of people, often men, has been channeled in a very anti-social, selfish and socially destructive direction."

=== Inequality ===
Acemoglu has voiced concerns regarding the increasing inequality in the US, which in his view turns into political inequality, in turn undermining the inclusiveness of US institutions. In 2012 he identified societal polarization, caused by economic inequality, as the biggest problem for the US. He argues that "democracy ceases to function because some people have so much money they command greater power." He states that he is comfortable with economic inequality which comes through different social contributions as it is a "price that we pay for providing incentives for people to contribute to prosperity." However, high levels of inequality create problems as the rich who control significant portions of the societal resources use them to create an "unequal distribution of political power." He sees the solution in increasing social mobility by "providing an opportunity for the bottom to become rich, not forcing the rich to become poor."

Acemoglu has praised the American tradition of vibrant protest movements dating back to the Populists and the Progressives. He has also praised Occupy Wall Street for "putting the question of inequality on the agenda, but also for actually standing up for political equality." He notes that Occupy Wall Street brought the 1% to the attention of the wider public, and to the attention of academia by Tony Atkinson, Thomas Piketty, and Emmanuel Saez.

=== Specific policies ===
Acemoglu is in favor of raising and indexing the minimum wage.

Acemoglu believes that universal basic income is "expensive and not generous enough" and that a "more efficient and generous social safety net is needed." He further called it a "flawed idea" and a "poorly designed policy." He instead advocates for a "guaranteed-income program [that] would offer transfers only to individuals whose monthly income is below $1,000, thereby coming in at a mere fraction of a UBI's cost." He calls for "universal health care, more generous unemployment benefits, better-designed retraining programs, and an expanded earned income tax credit (EITC)." Acemoglu supports a negative income tax, calling it a "more sensible" alternative to UBI.

Acemoglu believes that nation-building by the West is no longer possible around the world because the West now lacks the resources and commitment that were present in post-World War II Germany and Japan, and because countries where progress is needed today, such as in the Muslim- and Arab-majority world, do not trust the West.

He views the US war on drugs as a "total and very costly failure", and supported the 2013 ballot referendum Colorado Amendment 64, a successful popular initiative that legalized the sale of recreational marijuana.

In a 2016 interview with National Public Radio, he opined that the US infrastructure is in a "pitiful state, with negative consequences for US economic growth."

=== Socialism, communism, and Marxism ===
Acemoglu argues that socialist states have not been successful in creating prosperity. He wrote that socialist regimes "from Cuba to the eastern bloc have been disastrous both for economic prosperity and individual freedom."

In a review written with James A. Robinson, he argues that Thomas Piketty and Karl Marx are "led astray" due to their disregard for "the key forces shaping how an economy functions: the endogenous evolution of technology and of the institutions and the political equilibrium that influence not only technology but also how markets function and how the gains from different economic arrangements are distributed."

=== Social democracy and unions ===
In 2019, Acemoglu argued in favor of social democracy. He stated: "[Social democracy, when practiced by competent governments] is a phenomenal success. Everywhere in the west is to some degree social democratic, but the extent of this varies. We owe our prosperity and freedom to social democracy." However, he qualified this statement by arguing that social democracy "did not achieve these things by taxing and redistributing a lot. It achieved them by having labor institutions protecting workers, encouraging job creation and encouraging high wages." Following from this, Acemoglu opined that the economists of US presidential candidate Bernie Sanders, who is an advocate of democratic socialism along the lines of the Nordic model, "don't understand basic economics. They are not just dangerous, they are clueless."

Acemoglu argued that a "tradition of strong labor movement or social democratic party, by constraining the actions of the social planner, can act as a commitment device to egalitarianism, inducing an equilibrium in which the country in question becomes the beneficiary from the asymmetric world equilibrium."

=== Donald Trump ===
In an op-ed in Foreign Policy, Acemoglu claimed that President Donald Trump shared political goals and strategies of Hugo Chávez, Vladimir Putin, and Recep Tayyip Erdoğan, such as "little respect for the rule of law or the independence of state institutions, ... a blurred vision of national and personal interests, ... little patience with criticism and a long-established strategy of rewarding loyalty, which can be seen in his high-level appointments to date. This is all topped by an unwavering belief in his abilities." In a 2019 interview with Der Spiegel, Acemoglu stated that he sees similarities between Trump and the Republican Party and the Nazis: "Surely, Trump and the Republicans are no Nazis. But they are exploiting the same political sentiment." He argues that Trump "poses a great risk to U.S. democracy" because he is "looking for a new order with elements of anti-liberalism, misinformation and a lax attitude to corruption. If he is re-elected next year, it will be the beginning of the end of American democracy."

=== Authoritarian countries ===
According to Acemoglu, the three obstacles for economic growth under authoritarian regimes are the tendency of authoritarian regimes to become more authoritarian, their tendency to use power to halt "Schumpeterian creative destruction, which is key to sustaining growth" and the instability and uncertainty caused by internal conflicts. He believes that Saudi Arabia would be like a poor African country without the oil, while the "only thing that is keeping [Russia] going is a big boom in natural resources and a clever handling of the media."

He believes that China has managed to achieve significant economic growth because it "sort of picked up the low hanging fruit from the world technology frontier, but that sort of growth is not going to last until China goes to the next step, which is harnessing innovation," which he argues will be impossible "unless economic institutions become even more open and the extractive political institutions in China will be a barrier to that." He and Robinson wrote for the HuffPost that the "limited rights [China] affords its citizens places major restrictions on the country's longer-term possibilities for prosperity."

=== Turkey ===
Acemoglu opined that the Republic of Turkey, formed in 1923 by Atatürk, "is very continuous with the Ottoman Empire." Although the shift from empire to republic brought some positive changes, he argues, the model was largely maintained by the reformers who took power, citing a persistent concentration of power and economic activity. He suggests that the Republican period has been characterized by an unwillingness to accept ethnic minorities. In 2014, Acemoglu condemned the widespread anti-Armenian rhetoric in Turkish textbooks, and demanded that the books be pulled from circulation.

Acemoglu has criticized Recep Tayyip Erdoğan and his government for its authoritarian rule. In a 2013 op-ed in The New York Times, following the crackdown of Gezi Park protests, Acemoglu wrote that "Even before the brutal suppression of the demonstrations, the belief that Turkey was on its way to becoming a mature democracy — a role model for the rest of the Middle East — had already become untenable." In a May 2014 op-ed in Foreign Affairs, Acemoglu wrote that the drift from democracy by Erdogan is lamentable, but an "almost predictable, stage of Turkey's democratic transition." In the late 2010s, Acemoglu often criticized Turkey's economic policies and consequently became popular with the opposition.

=== Armenia ===
In a 2015 interview with the Armenian service of Voice of America, Acemoglu stated that he has always been interested in economic, political, and social developments in Armenia. Talking via video, Acemoglu partook in the Armenian Economic Association's annual conference in October 2013 held at the Yerevan State University, during which he argued that Armenia's problem is political, and not geographic, cultural, or geopolitical. He called for the Armenian government to be "more responsive to the wishes of its citizens so that through that political process Armenia ceases to be an oligarchy."

In a September 2016 conference in Toronto, Acemoglu criticized the Armenian diaspora for legitimizing the successive governments in Armenia, especially when the rights of its citizens are violated, and a wrong economic and political line is being followed in the country. In an April 2017 conference held by the USC Institute of Armenian Studies, Acemoglu stated that while "Armenia could have looked much more like the Czech Republic or Estonia and what we got instead is a country that looks much more like Azerbaijan or Uzbekistan, which is a real shame." He suggested that in the immediate post-Soviet years Armenia was "stronger and it's been getting worse and worse." He criticized the level of corruption of the government, which has systematically closed the political system.

=== Other countries ===
In an op-ed for The Globe and Mail following the 2014 Ukrainian revolution, Acemoglu advocated Ukraine "to break with its past as quickly as possible. It needs to move away from Russia, politically and economically, even if that means an end to the natural-gas subsidies Russia has used to keep it in the position of a client state. Even more important is for Ukraine's leaders to spread political power and economic benefits to the maximum number of its people, including Russian speakers."

Acemoglu argued that the Greek government-debt crisis was caused by the "terrible state of Greek institutions, and the clientelistic nature of its politics", and stated that the country's problems are "political not just macroeconomic." He identified lack of political integration within the EU as Greece's problem, and said that "the only way forward for Europe is to have greater fiscal and banking integration or to abandon monetary integration."

== Political involvement ==
=== Turkey ===
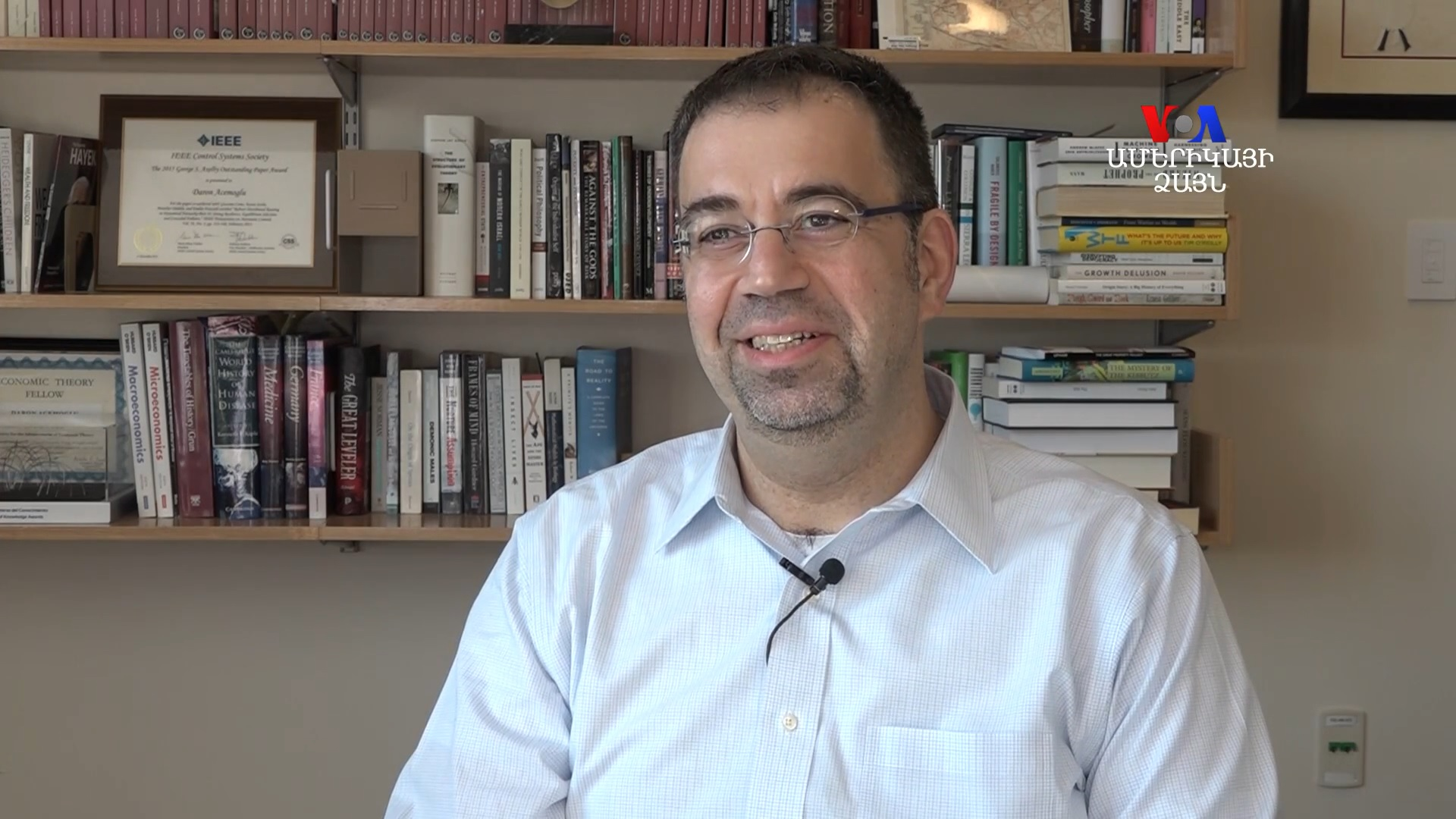
Acemoglu in 2018

In March 2011, Turkish Foreign Minister Ahmet Davutoğlu offered to appoint Acemoglu as Turkey's permanent representative to the OECD in Paris, a post he turned down in order to continue his academic career.

Acemoglu met with Kemal Kılıçdaroğlu, leader of the opposition Republican People's Party (CHP) in October 2022. In December 2022 Kılıçdaroğlu appointed Acemoglu, among others, as his economic adviser. Pro-Erdogan circles criticized the move. One pro-government columnist said: "The Armenian Daron Acemoğlu, praised by FETÖ, prepared Kılıçdaroğlu's vision program (resembling his own roots)." In response, finance professor Özgür Demirtaş defended Acemoglu. "This tweet is both racist and presumptuous. The influence of Daron Acemoğlu on world's economy-finance professors is greater than the number of cells in your body. It's terrible that you talk like this about a professor who made us proud and is going for the Nobel prize." Yeni Şafak, a pro-government newspaper, ran the headline: "Daron Acemoğlu, one of the new economic advisors of the CHP, could not solve the economic crisis of Armenia."

=== Armenia ===
Following the 2018 Armenian revolution, opposition leader-turned-Prime Minister Nikol Pashinyan wrote on his Facebook page that Acemoglu told him that he is ready to help Armenia to "restore and develop" its economy. Pashinyan and Acemoglu talked via the internet in June 2018. Acemoglu met with Deputy Prime Minister Tigran Avinyan in Boston in July 2019. In 2020, Acemoglu publicly emphasized the importance of institutional reforms for Armenia’s long-term economic development during interviews related to the country’s post-revolution economic strategy.

In October 2025, Acemoglu delivered a video message on Armenia's economic development to the meeting of Russian-Armenian billionaire Samvel Karapetyan's Our Way political movement, which was interpreted as joining or endorsing the future party. Acemoglu told Agos that he sent a message for their conference, but has "no connection with the party."

=== Anti-oligarchy ===
In November 2026, Acemoglu was among the signatories of the Paris manifesto against international oligarchy, issued by the participants in the 1st Paris Summit Against International Oligarchy. The manifesto called for the building of a "democratic International" and proposed a series of measures to combat the global power of "extreme wealth": a wealth tax and unpaid tax recovery scheme aimed at the ultra-rich, strengthening public control over the mass media after the model of the French press ordinance of 26 August 1944, and democratising artificial intelligence by entrusting the technology to international nonprofit foundations similar to Wikipedia.

== Recognition ==
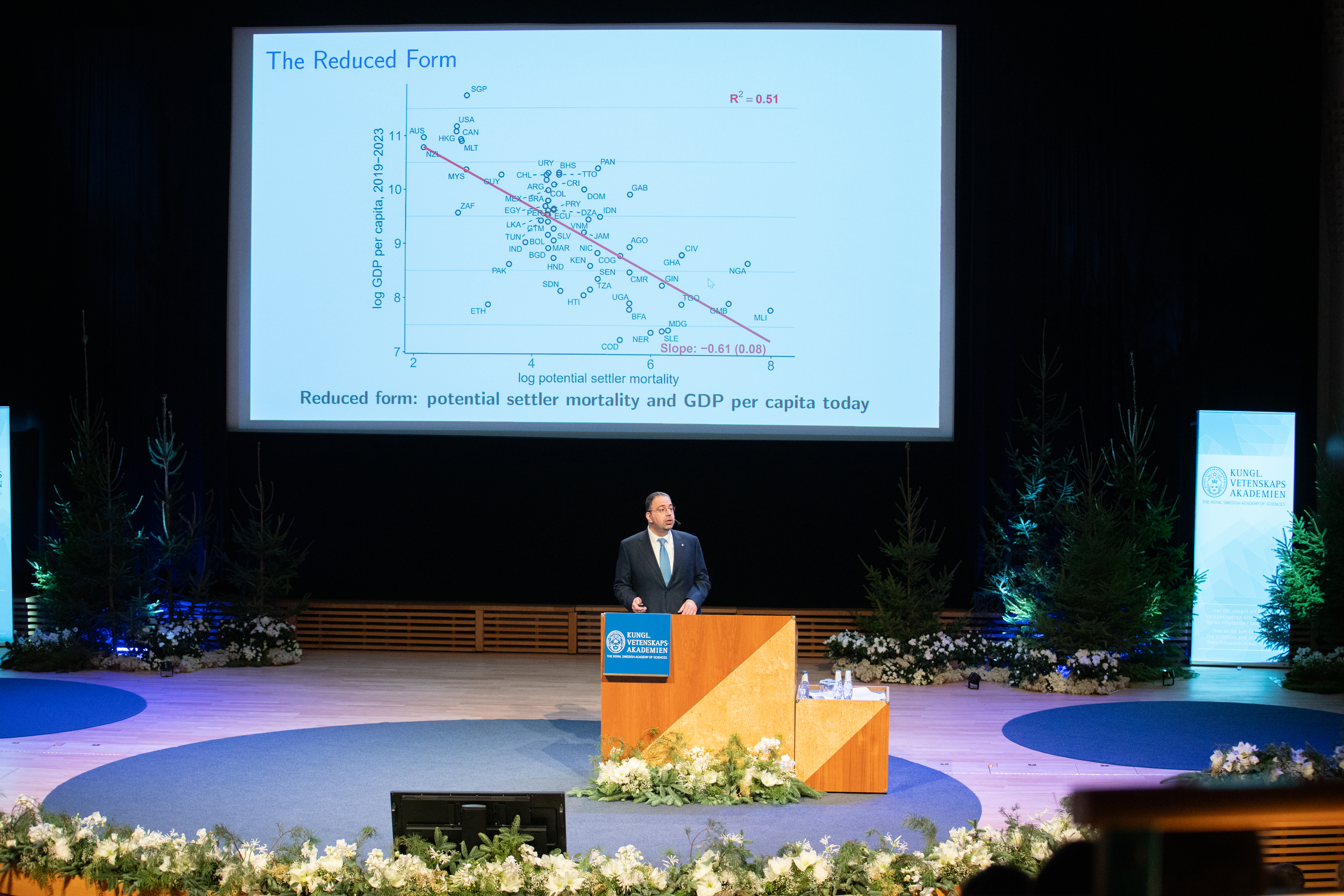
Acemoglu lecturing at 2024 Nobel Week

According to data collected by Research Papers in Economics (RePEc), Acemoglu was the most cited economist of the decade leading to 2015. According to Google Scholar, his works (including co-authored works) have been cited nearly 250,000 times as of November 2024. In a 2011 survey of 299 economics professors in the US, Acemoglu ranked third, behind Paul Krugman and Greg Mankiw, in the list of "Favorite Living Economists Under Age 60".

He was listed 88th in Foreign Policy's 2010 list of Top 100 Global Thinkers "for showing that freedom is about more than markets." Acemoglu was voted by the readers of Prospect Magazine as the world's top thinker for 2024. He was elected a fellow of the American Academy of Arts and Sciences in 2006.

Francis Fukuyama has described Acemoglu and his long-time collaborator James A. Robinson as "two of the world's leading experts on development." Clement Douglas wrote in the Federal Reserve Bank of Minneapolis publication that the "scope, depth and sheer volume of [his] scholarship are nothing short of breathtaking, verging on implausible." Angus Deaton called him a "young superstar" and noted that Acemoglu is "a very good example of the way things ought to be going, which is you do history but you know enough mathematics to be able to model it too."

=== Awards ===
Economics awards

- John Bates Clark Medal (2005) by the American Economic Association
- John von Neumann Award (2007) by Rajk László College for Advanced Studies
- Erwin Plein Nemmers Prize in Economics (2012) by Northwestern University "for fundamental contributions to the understanding of political institutions, technical change and economic growth"
- BBVA Foundation Frontiers of Knowledge Award (2016) "for proving the influence of institutions over economic development"
- Jean-Jacques Laffont Prize, Toulouse School of Economics (2018)
- Global Economy Prize, Kiel Institute for the World Economy (2019)
- Corresponding Fellow of the British Academy (2021)
- Omicron Delta Epsilon Distinguished Economist Award (2026)

State orders and awards

- Presidential Culture and Arts Grand Award in Social Sciences (2013) by Turkish President Abdullah Gül

Honorary degrees

Acemoglu has been awarded honorary degrees from the following universities: Utrecht University (2008), Boğaziçi University (2011), the University of Athens (2014), Bilkent University (2015), University of Bath (2017), ENS Paris-Saclay (2017), London Business School (2018), the University of Glasgow (2024), and the University of Oxford (2026).

Other

- Carnegie Fellow (2017)

==== Nobel Prize ====
Acemoglu was long considered a prospective Nobel laureate. In 2024, Acemoglu, jointly with James A. Robinson and Simon Johnson, were awarded the Nobel Memorial Prize in Economic Sciences for their comparative studies in prosperity among nations. The trio was recognized for their studies on how political and economic institutions impact a nation's development, highlighting the distinction between inclusive institutions, which promote widespread economic participation and growth, and extractive institutions, which concentrate power and wealth in the hands of a few. Acemoglu became the second ethnic Armenian (after Ardem Patapoutian) and third Turkish national (after Orhan Pamuk and Aziz Sancar) to become a Nobel laureate.

== Selected bibliography ==
- Acemoglu, Daron; Robinson, James A. (2006). Economic Origins of Dictatorship and Democracy. Cambridge University Press. ISBN 9780521855266.
- Acemoglu, Daron (2008). Introduction to Modern Economic Growth. Princeton University Press. ISBN 9781400835775.
- Acemoglu, Daron; Robinson, James A. (2012). Why Nations Fail. Crown Business. ISBN 978-0307719218.
- Acemoglu, Daron; Laibson, David and List, John (2014). Principles of Economics, Pearson, New York.
- Acemoglu, Daron; Robinson, James A. (2019). The Narrow Corridor: States, Societies, and the Fate of Liberty. Penguin Press. ISBN 978-0735224384. Description, arrow-searchable preview, & reviewers' comments (at bottom).
- Acemoglu, Daron, and Simon Johnson (2023). Power and Progress: Our Thousand-Year Struggle Over Technology and Prosperity. New York: PublicAffairs.
- Acemoglu, Daron (2026). What Happened to Liberal Democracy?: Remaking a Politics of Shared Prosperity. Dutton. ISBN 979-8217182169.
