= Robert Shimer =

American economist

- Born: August 21, 1968 (age 58)

Academic background
- Education: MIT; Oxford University; Yale University
- Doctoral advisor: Olivier Blanchard; Daron Acemoglu

Academic work
- Discipline: Macroeconomics, labor economics
- Institutions: University of Chicago
- Website: Information at IDEAS / RePEc

Robert Shimer (born August 21, 1968) is an American macroeconomist and labor economist who currently holds the George J. Stigler Distinguished Service Professor in Economics and the College at the University of Chicago. From 2018 through 2024 he served two terms at the Chair of the Kenneth C. Griffin Department of Economics. He was an editor of the Journal of Political Economy from 2004 to 2012. His research focuses on the search and matching approach to labor economics. He is especially known for arguing that the standard labor market matching model predicts fluctuations in the unemployment rate much smaller than those actually observed over the business cycle, an observation which has sometimes been called the Shimer puzzle. His book Labor Markets and Business Cycles was published in 2010 by Princeton University Press, and was recommended by Robert Hall:

Shimer's definitive account of the modern theory of labor market volatility presents many new results and deserves a prominent place on the bookshelf of every macroeconomist and labor economist.

== Publication ==
- Shimer, Robert (2010). Labor Markets and Business Cycles. CREI Lectures in Macroeconomics. Princeton and Oxford: Princeton University Press. ISBN 978-0691140223.

== Research ==
=== Labor Choice ===
In 2017, Shimer coauthored a paper entitled, "High Wage Workers Work for High Wage Firms." The working paper sought to measure the correlation between worker quality and firm wage rates. Using Austrian administrative data, he found a correlation between worker and firm types of 0.4 to 0.6. This implies a contradiction to previous work which found no correlation between types.
