= Simon Johnson (economist) =

British-American economist (born 1963)

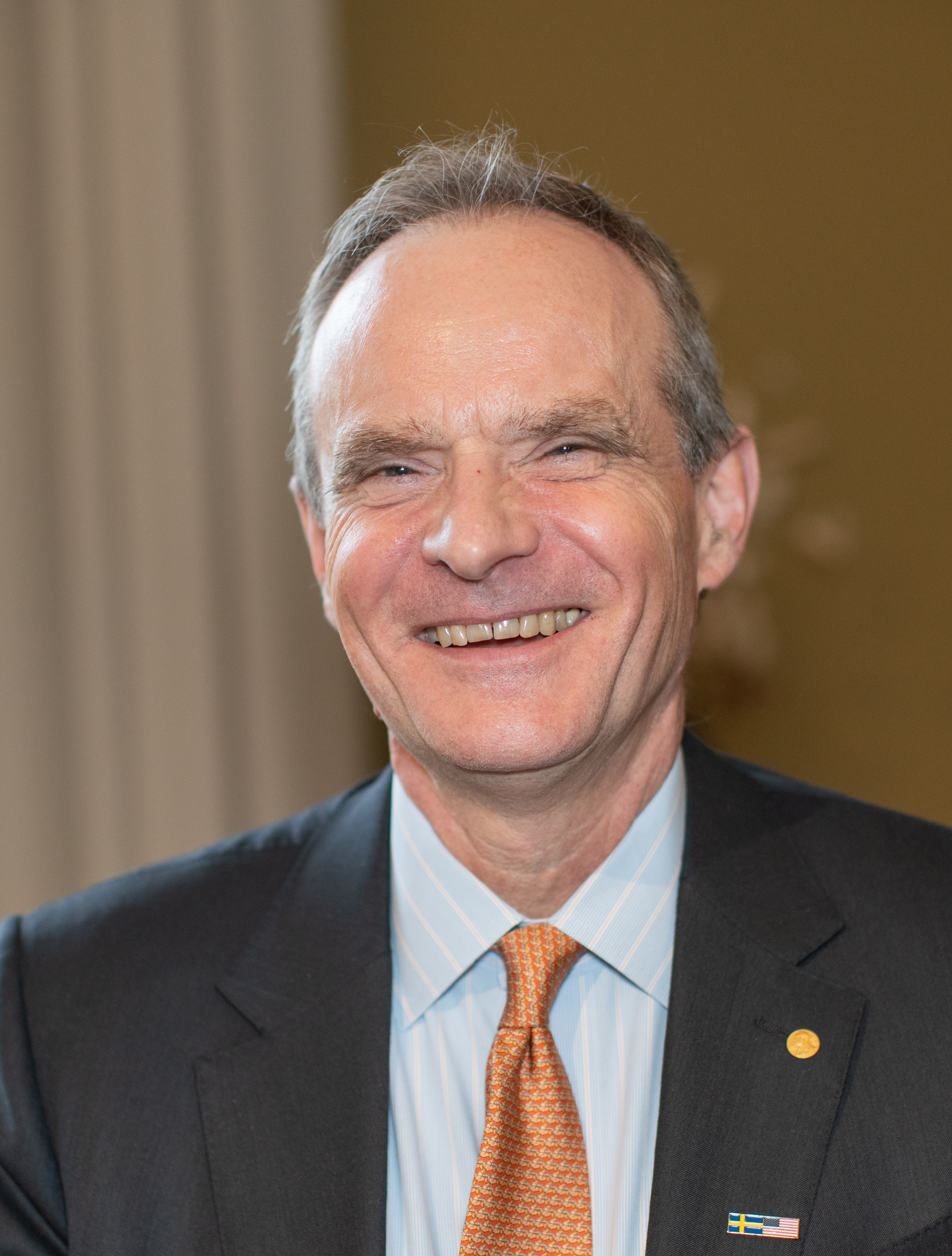
- Johnson in 2024

Chief Economist of the International Monetary Fund
- In office March 2007 – August 31, 2008
- President: Rodrigo Rato; Dominique Strauss-Kahn
- Preceded by: Raghuram Rajan
- Succeeded by: Olivier Blanchard

Personal details
- Born: January 16, 1963 (age 63) Sheffield, England, UK
- Education: Corpus Christi College, Oxford (BA); University of Manchester (MA); Massachusetts Institute of Technology (PhD)
- Awards: Nobel Memorial Prize in Economic Sciences (2024)

Academic background
- Thesis: Inflation, Intermediation, and Economic Activity (1989)
- Doctoral advisor: Rudiger Dornbusch

Academic work
- Discipline: Political economy Development economics
- Website: Information at IDEAS / RePEc

Simon H. Johnson (born January 16, 1963) is a British-American economist. He is the Ronald A. Kurtz Professor of Entrepreneurship at the MIT Sloan School of Management since 2004. He also served as a senior fellow at the Peterson Institute for International Economics from 2008 to 2019. Before moving to MIT, he taught at Duke University's Fuqua School of Business from 1991 to 1997. From March 2007 through the end of August 2008, he served as Chief Economist of the International Monetary Fund.

In 2024, Johnson, Daron Acemoglu, and James A. Robinson were awarded the Nobel Memorial Prize in Economic Sciences for their comparative studies in prosperity between nations.

== Education ==
Born in 1963 in Sheffield, Johnson was privately educated at Abbotsholme School in Rocester and then went onto read Philosophy, Politics and Economics (PPE) at the University of Oxford where he was an undergraduate student at Corpus Christi College, Oxford and graduated in 1984. He then received an MA in economics (with distinction) from the University of Manchester in 1986. He went on to doctoral study at the Massachusetts Institute of Technology, where he was advised by Rudiger Dornbusch and received a PhD in economics in 1989, writing a dissertation entitled Inflation, intermediation, and economic activity.

== Career and research ==
From 1989 to 1991, Johnson was a junior scholar at Harvard University, where he was a member of the Harvard Academy for International and Area Studies and a fellow of its Russian Research Center. From 1991 to 1997, he taught at the Fuqua School of Business at Duke University, where he was an assistant professor until 1995, and an associate professor until 1997; he also directed its Center for Manager Development in St Petersburg, Russia from 1993 to 1995. He joined the faculty of MIT in 1997, and was tenured in 2002. At MIT, he is a research affiliate at Blueprint Labs, co-directs MIT's Shaping the Future of Work Initiative, and heads its Global Economics and Management Group.

Johnson has been a research associate at the NBER since 2004, and is an affiliate of BREAD. He is a fellow of the CEPR, and has sat on the board of directors of Fannie Mae since 2021. He co-founded the CFA Institute’s Systemic Risk Council, and has been a monthly columnist at Project Syndicate since 2010. In November 2020, Johnson was named a volunteer member of the Joe Biden presidential transition Agency Review Team to support transition efforts related to the United States Department of Treasury and the Federal Reserve.

In June 2026 the UK government announced the formation of the AI Economics Institute, with Johnson as chair.

=== Affiliations ===
Johnson is a member of the International Advisory Council at the Center for Social and Economic Research (CASE). He is also a member of the Congressional Budget Office's Panel of Economic Advisers. From 2006 to 2007, he was a visiting fellow at the Peterson Institute for International Economics, where he was a senior fellow from 2008 to 2019. He is on the editorial board of four academic economics journals. He has contributed to Project Syndicate since 2007.

=== Research ===
Johnson's research with Daron Acemoglu and James A. Robinson examined how institutions formed during European colonization affected later prosperity. They found that extractive institutions tended to persist and inhibit long-term growth, while more inclusive institutions supported broader prosperity.

He wrote the 2010 book 13 Bankers: The Wall Street Takeover and the Next Financial Meltdown (ISBN 978-0307379054), along with James Kwak, with whom he has also co-founded and regularly contributes to the economics blog The Baseline Scenario. He is also author of White House Burning: Our National Debt and Why It Matters to You (2013); Jump-Starting America: How Breakthrough Science Can Revive Economic Growth and the American Dream (2019), with Jonathan Gruber; and Power and Progress: Our Thousand-Year Struggle Over Technology and Prosperity (2023), with Daron Acemoglu.

=== Power and Progress ===
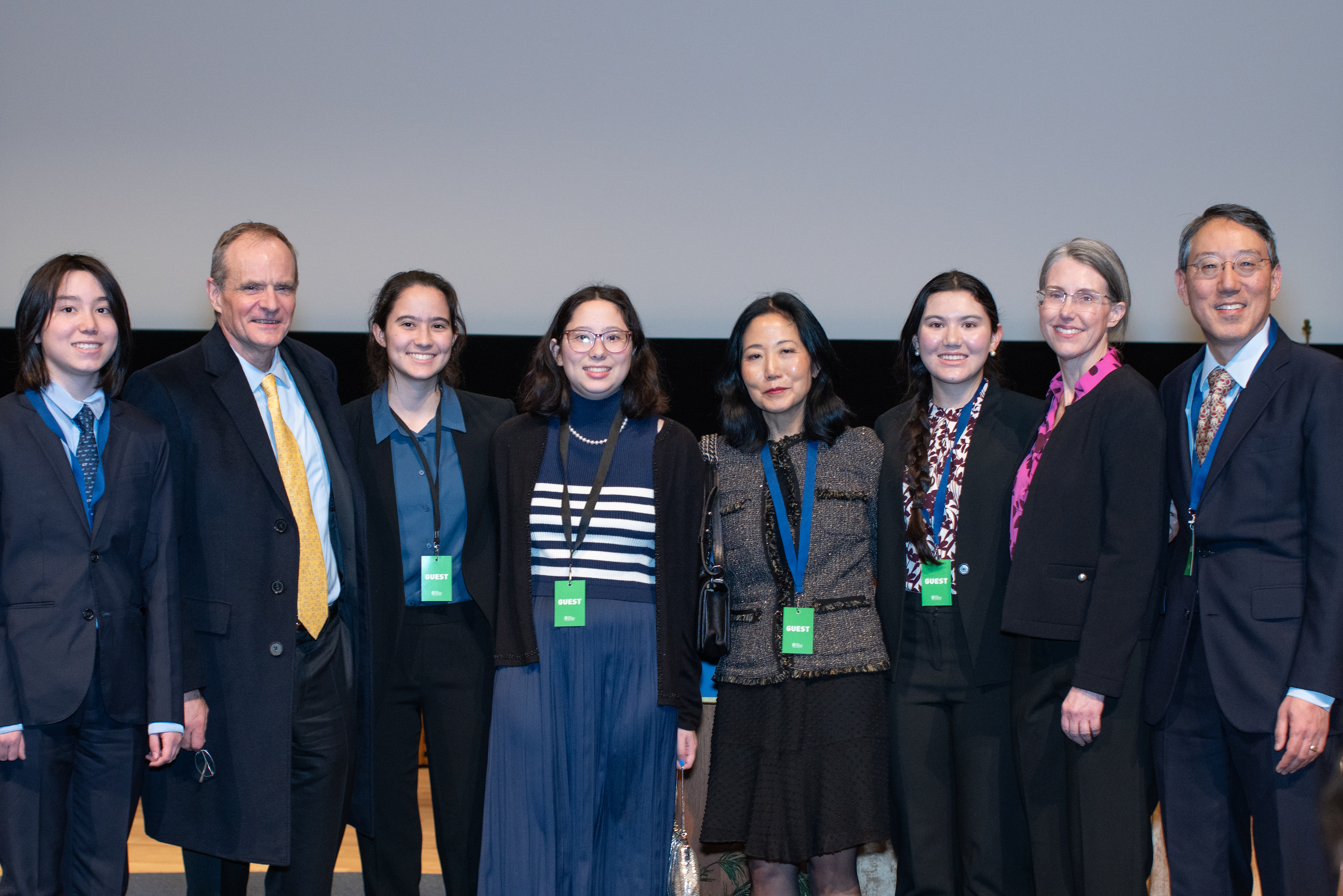
Johnson, second from left, with friends and family at 2024 Nobel Week

Published in 2023, Power and Progress is a book on the historical development of technology and the social and political consequences of technology. The book addresses three questions, on the relationship between new machines and production techniques and wages, on the way in which technology could be harnessed for social goods, and on the reason for the enthusiasm around artificial intelligence (AI).

Power and Progress argues that technologies do not automatically yield social goods, their benefits going to a narrow elite. It offers a rather critical view of artificial intelligence, stressing its largely negative impact on jobs and wages and on democracy.

Acemoglu and Johnson also provide a vision about how new technologies could be harnessed for social good. They see the Progressive Era as offering a model. And they discuss a list of policy proposals for the redirection of technology that includes market incentives, the break up of big tech, tax reform, investing in workers, privacy protection and data ownership, and a digital advertising tax.

== Award ==
He received in 2025 a Carnegie Corporation of New York Great Immigrant Award

== Personal life ==
Johnson is married with two daughters.

== See also ==
- Brown–Kaufman amendment
- Colonial Origins of Comparative Development

Diplomatic posts
Preceded by Raghuram Rajan	Chief Economist of the International Monetary Fund; 2007–2008	Succeeded by Olivier Blanchard
