= Asuman Özdağlar =

Turkish academic (born 1974)

Asu Ozdaglar
- Born: December 16, 1974 (age 51)
- Education: METU (BS); MIT (SM, PhD)
- Known for: Game theory, Optimization, Networks, Machine Learning; EECS Department head at MIT
- Father: İsmail Özdağlar
- Scientific career
- Fields: Applied Mathematics, Computer Science, Operations Research
- Workplaces: Massachusetts Institute of Technology
- Doctoral advisor: Dimitri Bertsekas
- Doctoral students: Ilan Lobel, Kostas Bimpikis, Ozan Candogan, Kimon Drakopoulos, Ali Kakhbod, Ermin Wei, Ali ParandehGheibi, James Siderius, Ali Makhdoumi, Alireza Fallah.
- Website: asu.mit.edu

Asu Özdağlar (born December 16, 1974) is a Turkish computer scientist and a professor at the Massachusetts Institute of Technology.

== Early life ==
She was born to İsmail Özdağlar and Zahide Özdağlar on December 16, 1974. Her father İsmail Özdağlar was a former Minister of State, between December 13, 1983, and January 15, 1985, in the 45th government of Turkey.

== Career ==
Özdağlar attended the Middle East Technical University (METU) in Ankara, earning a BS degree in Electrical Engineering in 1996. She then pursued further studies at the Massachusetts Institute of Technology (MIT), where she obtained an SM degree in 1998 and a PhD in 2003, both in Electrical Engineering and Computer Science. She has served as an assistant professor (2003), associate professor (2008), and professor (2012) in the same university.

Her research expertise includes optimization, machine learning, economics, and networks. Her recent research focuses on designing incentives and algorithms for data-driven online systems with many diverse human-machine participants. She has investigated issues of data ownership and markets, spread of misinformation on social media, economic and financial contagion, and social learning.

In 2018, she was named the new head of the Department of Electrical Engineering and Computer Science (EECS) at MIT. Her predecessor Anantha Chandrakasan said: "Professor Ozdaglar is an inspiring researcher and has emerged as a true leader in the areas of optimization theory and algorithms, game theory, and networks." In 2020, she took on the role of Deputy Dean of Academics for the Schwarzman College of Computing.
