= Colonial Origins of Comparative Development =

2001 economics paper by Acemoglu, Johnson, and Robinson

The Colonial Origins of Comparative Development: An Empirical Investigation
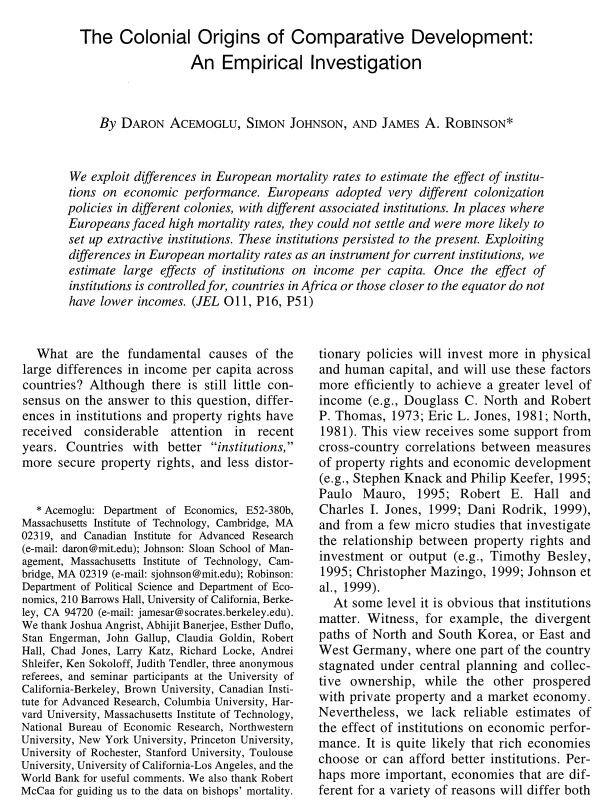
- Author: Daron Acemoglu, Simon Johnson, James A. Robinson
- Language: English
- Genre: Economics
- Publisher: American Economic Association
- Publication date: December 2001

"The Colonial Origins of Comparative Development" is a 2001 article written by Daron Acemoglu, Simon Johnson, and James A. Robinson and published in American Economic Review. It is considered a seminal contribution to development economics through its use of European settler mortality as an instrumental variable of institutional development in former colonies. The theory proposed in the article is that Europeans only set up growth-inducing institutions in areas where the disease environment was favourable so that they could settle. In areas with unfavourable disease environments to Europeans, such as central Africa, they instead set up extractive institutions which persist to the present day and explain much of the variation in income across countries. Other theories explored in the article argue that it is the choices of institutions within the country that result in the effective and efficient use of resources in leading to the successful development of that country. Important issues with the data and analysis have been identified, causing some doubt as to the accuracy of these results.

The trio of authors have won the 2024 Nobel Memorial Prize in Economic Sciences.

== Summary ==
The first question the authors ask is simple: "What are the fundamental causes of the large differences in income per capita across countries?". Although the authors are aware of the fact that no consensus has been reached on this question, they suggest that institutions might have something to do with this problem.

In this paper, they offer a theory of variation in institutions among former colonies of European countries impacting the economic performance of a country, based on three premises:

1. Extractive states were set up in colonies in order to extract as many resources as possible which were then transferred to the colonizer. Consequently, these extractive states did not perform well economically as there were no proper institutions set in place to govern the state. This lack of institutions meant that there were no checks and balances on the governing body which then can exert its power without oversight. On the other hand, states where proper institutions were put in place resulted in economic success.

2. The choice of settling at particular geographic locations by the colony also played a part in determining whether an extractive state or colony was set up by the colonizer. In regions where European settlement faced high mortality rates due to disease, the colonizers were likely to create an extractive state as it is difficult to create a sustainable settlement.

3. Another indicator of economic performance is whether colonial institutions still exist after independence has been won. In the scenario where colonial institutions remain, this would allow pre-existing wealth-generating assets to continue to operate in a similar manner.

By the diversity of colonization policies, the authors mean different natures and degrees of various policies, with the presence of European colonisers being an important factor influencing the form of colonialism.

Countries with a significant number of European settlers and policies or rights similar to those of their motherlands are given the name "Neo-Europes" (a name first introduced by historian Alfred Crosby in 1986). In these colonies, established institutions followed the model of their home country. If not, settlers were prepared to impose them by force. Their argument was that they were still citizens of their native country and thus had the right to be treated similarly to their homelands. This was the case of Australia in the 1840s, where most settlers were former criminals, whereas landowners were mostly former jailors, which led to pressure to implement constitutional changes.

On the other side, states with little protection of property rights and expropriation by governments are labelled by the authors as “extractive states”. Especially in Spanish and Portuguese American colonies, the main object was to extract as many metals and other commodities as possible. Similar situations were observable in British West Africa (including the Gold Coast), in the Ivory Coast, and possibly in the most extreme case of Congo Free State.

The feasibility of settlements was mostly related to the presence of various diseases in potential colonies. It is documented that this factor was of great importance, as it was, for example, in the case of the Pilgrims. When choosing their destination, they decided to migrate to the Thirteen Colonies which became the United States, and not to another British colony, British Guiana, because of lower mortality in the United States. When deciding where to send criminals, several locations were rejected due to high mortality rates and Australia was chosen as the final destination for convicts. The mortality rate was also one of the significant factors influencing the development of new settlements – a higher probability of survival was more attractive to potential new colonists.

The persistence of institutions works with the concept that institutions introduced by colonizers prevailed in countries even after the natives declared independence from their colonizers. There are several possibilities; the authors of this paper offer three of them. Firstly, introducing new institutions is costly. Elites may prefer to keep functioning institutions instead of introducing new, more expensive ones. Secondly, the smaller the ruling elite, and the bigger the gains from extractive strategy, the bigger the incentives to keep running institutions. Thirdly, agents who irreversibly invested (directly or indirectly) in institutions might be more willing to keep those institutions.

The authors exploit these three premises as a base to use the mortality of European colonists as an instrument for present institutions in those countries. Their hypothesis is the following: mortality rate of settlers influenced settlements, settlements affected early institutions, and those, in turn, created the foundation of current institutions.

In one sample of 75 former European colonies, a strongly negative relationship was found between current GDP per capita and mortality rate per thousand of former settlers in these countries (from the seventeenth to the nineteenth century). The authors claim that the lethality of colonists in the past explains more than 25% of the variation in institutions in the present, adding that the mortality of colonists has no impact on current GDP per capita in those countries but the ones caused by institutional development.

An important note is their exclusion of correlations between disease environment and current economic performance. There may be a tendency to connect the lethality of settlers to the occurrence of illnesses (which is not wrong), however, it is important to bear in mind that the difference in immune strength between colonists and local inhabitants, who had been exposed to local diseases for centuries, differs, and thus it is very unlikely that economic performance of former European colonies is determined by disease occurrence. The authors illustrate contrasts between the immunities of local people and settlers an example of troops in British India. Units in this colony consisted of soldiers recruited locally as well as of soldiers who arrived with their units from the British Isles. According to Curtin, 1968, who is cited by the authors, the mortality rate of British soldiers in Britain and local conscripts serving in the British Army in India was approximately the same. However, the lethality among British soldiers in India was 7–10 times higher than the lethality of local Indian soldiers.

The authors also observe that outliers do not change the result. Excluding developed countries such as Australia or New Zealand has no effect, nor does excluding African countries. Another important observation is that estimates barely changed when controls for other variables such as main colonizer, religion, legal origin or culture were included.

The authors also point out that they know about other scholars dealing with the mortality of colonizers and institutions, but they consider their approach as new since no scholar before had examined the relationship between mortality, settlements and institutions specifically. Another innovation in this work consists in looking at the above-mentioned factors regardless of the nationality of colonizers. Many economists (e.g. von Hayek, La Porta, Landes, among others) studied the importance of colonial origins, but these works were mostly focused on differences in the nationality of settlers who colonized countries (mostly investigating differences between British colonies and colonies of the French Empire or Spanish Empire, since these countries were the biggest colonizers at the time). However, this study is centered exclusively on conditions in the colonies, disregarding the origin of the settlers.

The final result the authors examine was that there is a high correlation between mortality rates and settlements, between settlements and early institutions, and between early and current institutions. They also point out that institutions and economic performance are not predestined and thus are open to change (as in the case of Republic of Korea in the 1960s). The authors also admit that there are still many questions not been answered and are subject to further studies.

== Criticism ==
A replication of the study was published in the same journal eleven years later by David Y. Albouy in the article 'The Colonial Origins Of Comparative Development: An Investigation Of The Settler Mortality Data' who argued that the mortality rates for 28 countries used in the sample by the authors are from within the country themselves; yet, there are also another 36 countries within the same sample size in which their mortality rates are judgmentally determined by the authors based on similar disease environments to the 28 nations, resulting in inaccurate assumptions. Albouy argues that this sample selection of affixing mortality rate to a country based on data from the neighboring country is dubious since the authors did not provide a robust explanation in determining how the two countries have similar disease environments. Albouy explains that there is inconsistency within the authors' treatment of mortality rates given that the authors assign certain rates to neighboring countries but then determine the same mortality rate across other neighboring countries. Albouy further highlights that the sample selection was questionable given how countries were selected as samples based on the author's confusion over former names of African countries and the poor use of unreliable mortality data. The original authors dismissed Albouy's criticism in their subsequent reply with the article 'The Colonial Origins of Comparative Development: An Empirical Investigation: Reply'.

Another criticism is that human capital, not institutions, is the more basic driver of economic growth. Glaeser (et al.), using the same settler mortality instrument for human capital, found that human capital performs better econometrically than institutional quality. Institutions thrive when there is a high level of human and social capital as this is the proponent that drives the modus operandi of institutions and the production of an economy. This is different to what has been proposed by the authors since institutions evidently seem not to have a large impact on economic growth.

Further criticisms were directed at the assumptions the author has used over certain settler rates and fatality rates which were not accurately obtained from European settlers. On the contrary, the author’s rates were relying on 19th-century data from American and European troops which is different to the data of settlers. In certain nations, the author used rates from troops in barracks during peacetime, whereas in others, rates from soldiers on the campaign are used. Because soldiers stationed at base are often healthier than when committed to combat, soldiers on the campaign have a greater fatality rate from sickness. This is due to the fact that troops in wartime took fewer illness precautions and lacked access to good drinking water. This is evident by the high mortality rates (332) incurred by soldiers on the campaign compared to low mortality rates (<25) incurred by soldiers in barracks. As a result of the increased exposure to infections, soldiers in wartime saw greater death rates. Albouy also argues that the mortality rates obtained from soldiers do not provide an accurate basis in determining the mortality of civilian settlement since both are unlikely to be in the same living conditions. Soldiers would generally have worse living conditions compared to civilian settlements and will generally have a higher mortality rate, thereby impacting the reliability of the data the authors have used in their findings. Similar to soldiers in peacetime, civilians who have access to good drinking water and sewage disposal can reduce the risk of contracting the disease and therefore lower mortality rates.

== Response to criticism ==
Following the criticism from Albouy in 2011, the authors responded with an article 'The Colonial Origins of Comparative Development: An Empirical Investigation: Reply' addressing the concerns raised by Albouy. One of the concerns relates to the high level of mortality data used in locations such as Africa, where outlier events like epidemics were present which would skew the data. The authors responded that this was not an issue since epidemic events were originally flagged in the article and that it should be included in the study if it affected the perception of European settlers. The authors also included a scenario where they capped mortality rates at 250 per 1,000 each year which was the average mortality rate for European soldiers in the early 19th century. This level of mortality rate is still considered as high enough to alarm European settlers from the settlement at these locations. The authors find that the capping of the mortality rates results in the same outcome as their original article.

The authors further argue against Albouy’s justification for removing 60 percent of the sample of nations selected in determining the mortality rate due to unreliable information on the mortality of Europeans in Latin America and much of Africa during the colonial period. The authors state that a high degree of information was collected on nations proposed for the omission by Albouy and that these data were often viewed by Europeans as a contributing factor for not settling in these nations and therefore reliable. For example, data used in determining the mortality rate of soldiers in West Africa were primarily obtained from Curtin which is consistent with other sources from the Institute of Actuaries (life insurance literature), Bruce-Chwatt, and Kuczynski. A similar case is presented for Central Africa where data primarily sourced from Curtin is consistent with findings from Hunter, Sprague, and Kiple. In addition, the authors also ran a scenario that includes all of Albouy’s suggestions; however, it resulted in inaccurate confidence sets. Even if 60 percent of the samples were removed in order to achieve a different outcome to the original article, the outcome suggested by Albouy is largely a result of the impact from an outlier from Gambia since it had a positive settlement and institutional levels, and not from the sample removal. The authors conclude by capping mortality rates to 250 in order to exclude factors such as epidemics that increase mortality rates or omitting outliers such as Gambia, Albouy’s suggestions do not result in a significant impact on the author’s findings from their original article.

Albouy also proposes that the twenty remaining countries from the sample size of mortality rates should be removed. The twenty countries are spread across Africa, the Caribbean, Asia, and Australia, given the unreliable information on European mortality rates from those locations. The authors again argue that removing these samples would have minimal impact on the initial results. In addition, doubts over the reliability of the data were refuted by the authors who highlighted that the mortality data used were from independent and credible sources such as Tulloch, the Statistical Society of London, and public health literature. Therefore, the authors conclude that there is no justification for the removal of these remaining non-African countries from the original dataset.

In addition, the authors also argued against Albouy’s criticism that military campaigns, where European soldiers are stationed in different geographic locations, pushed mortality rates above what they would be in peacetime. However, soldiers who lived in barracks were just as exposed to local diseases such as contaminated water and insects as the soldiers who were on campaign. The authors also state that major wars were removed from the dataset due to an increase in mortality rates that would not have otherwise occurred naturally. As a result, there is not much difference between soldiers in campaigns and soldiers in peacetime, and therefore the authors argue against distinguishing the two apart. The authors then criticize Albouy’s method of deciding which country sample's data are considered campaign mortality rates or non-campaign mortality rates. For instance, Albouy considered the mortality rates of soldiers stationed in New Zealand as non-campaign rates, yet the loss of soldiers as a result of military conflicts against Maori tribes was higher than mortality from diseases and accidents. This would make it seem that New Zealand's mortality rate should be considered a campaign rate instead of a non-campaign rate given the higher death toll from conflicts. Another similar instance occurred in the Hong Kong sample where Albouy had considered its rate as a non-campaign rate, yet mortality data were sourced from the military organization China Field Force. As a result, the authors put into question the judgment of campaign and non-campaign rates proposed by Albouy.

The authors conclude that upon inspection of Albouy’s objections to their initial journal findings in 2001, most of the objections are largely inconsequential to the results established by the authors. In essence, Europeans during the colonial period preferred locations that had low mortality rates and as a result the European settlers imposed better institutions, thereby improving the economies of those regions, which have persisted from the colonial period to the present.

== See also ==
- History of colonialism
- Law and economics
- New institutional economics
