= CESifo Economic Studies =

- Discipline: Economics
- Language: English
- Edited by: Panu Poutvaara

Publication details
- Former name(s): IFO Studien
- History: 1955–present
- Publisher: CESifo Group; Oxford University Press
- Impact factor: 0.620 (2011)

Standard abbreviations
- ISO 4: CESifo Econ. Stud.

Indexing
- ISSN: 1612-7501 (print); 1610-241X (web)

Links
- Journal homepage

CESifo Economic Studies is a journal on economics published by the CESifo Group. It was established as IFO Studien in 1955 and obtained its current title in 2002.

The journal is abstracted and indexed by the Social Sciences Citation Index, Current Contents/Social and Behavioral Sciences, EconLit, International Bibliography of the Social Sciences, Journal Citation Reports/Social Sciences Edition, ProQuest, RePEc, Scopus, Social Science Research Network, and Social SciSearch.
