= Stabilization of fragile states =

Promoting recovery from conflict is not limited to simply a humanitarian, security or development issue and often involves a combination of all three. Stabilization of fragile states is an approach and a process regarding the fragility and security of these states.

Stabilization processes are a multisectoral effort. While stabilization is firmly rooted in security agendas focused on reducing or eliminating perceived threats, accumulated experience of international intervention and engagement to end conflicts and foster peace and development over the past decade has emphasized the need to integrate military, political, development and humanitarian action. In contexts as diverse as Afghanistan, Haiti and Timor-Leste, stabilization has emerged therefore as a key instrument of a broader liberal, transformative peace-building project. As such, it extends beyond short-term or conservative objectives to eliminate immediate threats or merely to ‘stabilize’ temporarily situations of acute crisis to link action across a range of discrete policy spheres with the aim of reducing violence and establishing the political and social conditions necessary for recovery, reconstruction, development and a lasting peace.

== See also ==
- Fragile state
- Fragile States Index
- Rogue state
- Failed state
- Crisis States Research Centre
