= Legal vacuum =

Legal vacuum may refer to:

- A legal context which is non liquet ("it is not clear"), there is no applicable law, or in which some injustice is uncorrected
- A failed or collapsed state
