= Fragile state =

Unstable state on the verge of failure

A fragile state or weak state is a country characterized by weak state capacity or weak state legitimacy leaving citizens vulnerable to a range of shocks. The World Bank, for example, deems a country to be ‘fragile’ if it (a) is eligible for assistance (i.e., a grant) from the International Development Association (IDA), (b) has had a UN peacekeeping mission in the last three years, and (c) has received a ‘governance’ score of less than 3.2 (as per the Country Policy and Institutional Assessment (CPIA) index of The World Bank). A more cohesive definition of the fragile state might also note a state's growing inability to maintain a monopoly on force in its declared territory. While a fragile state might still occasionally exercise military authority or sovereignty over its declared territory, its claim grows weaker as the logistical mechanisms through which it exercises power grow weaker.

While many countries are making progress toward achieving the Sustainable Development Goals, a group of 35 to 50 countries (depending on the measure used) are falling behind. It is estimated that out of the world's seven billion people, 26% live in fragile states, and this is where one-third of all people surviving on less than US$1.25 per day live, where half of the world's children die before the age of five, and where one-third of maternal deaths occur.

Not only are they falling behind, but the gap with other developing countries is widening since the 1970s. In 2006, per capita GDP grew only at 2% in fragile states, whereas it reached 6% in other low-income countries. Fragile states are projected (for example, World Bank, 2008) to constitute an even larger share of low-income countries in the future given that many better performing low-income countries graduate to a middle-income status. This is a major challenge for development efforts and it has been argued by the Overseas Development Institute that fragile states require fundamentally different approaches from the development models exercised in more resilient countries, because of the differences in their risk contexts.

One common measure of state fragility is the World Bank's Country Policy and Institutional Assessment index, but more complex indexes, for example ones that include security dimensions, are increasingly being used. A fragile state in the brink of collapse may result in a failed state.

== Definition ==
Fragile states are also known as weak states. Fragile states fail to fully meet key needs of their citizens. The shortcomings are termed gaps, with three core gaps: security gap, capacity gap, and legitimacy gap. The security gap means the state does not provide adequate protection to its citizens; the capacity gap means the state does not fully provide adequate services; and the legitimacy gap means that the authority of the state is not fully accepted. This differs from a failed state, whose governments totally lack legitimacy. Weak states may be difficult to define, as the states fail to collect thorough statistics on crime and education.

In terms of dynamics, fragile states include:

- Conflict/post-conflict/crisis/war or political transition situations.
- Deteriorating governance environments.
- Situations of gradual improvement.
- Situations of prolonged political or economic crisis or impasse.

A fragile state is significantly susceptible to crisis in one or more of its sub-systems. It is a state that is particularly vulnerable to internal and external shocks and domestic and international conflicts. Fragile states are not only evaluated by degree of fragility but also types of state fragility and threat they pose in to help policymakers to appropriate responses. In a fragile state, institutional arrangements embody and perhaps preserve the conditions of crisis: in economic terms, this could be institutions (importantly, property rights) that reinforce stagnation or low growth rates, or embody extreme inequality (in wealth, in access to property and land ownership, in access to the means to make a living); in social terms institutions may embody extreme inequality or lack of access altogether to health or education; in political terms, institutions may entrench exclusionary coalitions in power (in ethnic, religious, or perhaps regional terms), or extreme factionalism or significantly fragmented security organisations. In fragile states, statutory institutional arrangements are vulnerable to challenges by rival institutional systems be they derived from traditional authorities, devised by communities under conditions of stress that see little of the state (in terms of security, development or welfare), or be they derived from warlords, or other non-state power brokers. Fragile states might also offer citizens multiple, overlapping institutions from highly variant power sources that are competing for legitimacy. While, as opposed to a weak state, these different institutions might not be in direct conflict, they do offer strong competing narratives that hamper the progress of good governance.

The opposite of a "fragile state" is a "stable state" – one where dominant or statutory institutional arrangements appear able to withstand internal and external shocks and contestation remains within the boundaries of reigning institutional arrangements. With the right conditions, some countries – such as Mozambique and Burundi – have so far demonstrated a remarkable turn-around. To address the challenge of these countries falling behind, the international spotlight must be kept on countries where the Millennium Development Goals are hardest to achieve, using common principles for action; making the international aid architecture more rational; improving the organisational response of the wide range of actors involved (including "the 3Ds": diplomacy, defense and development); and measuring results.

While there are no universal criteria to determine state fragility, the World Bank, through its LICUS programme (Low Income Countries Under Stress) and its Country Policy and Institutional Assessment (CPIA) Index, has been able to establish a preeminent frame of reference for donor countries and other institutional partners. Based on four clusters (including economic management, structural policies, policies for social inclusion/equity and Public Sector Management and institutions) as well as 16 indicators, the CPIA index rates state performance, with those countries scoring under 3.2 out of a total of 6 qualifying as "fragile". Such low performing countries may then be, in turn, suitable for the allocation of financial assistance from a variety of international actors such as the International Development Association and other, similar bodies.

=== Origins of the term and discussion ===
Fragile state is an analytical category that gained prominence from the mid 1990s onwards and gained further traction after the 9/11 terrorist attacks. Background is the belief held by many policy-makers and academics alike that the potential for contemporary conflict is harboured within, not between, states. Low capacity and low-income states of the Global South are thought to pose direct threats not only to their own populations, but by extension also to their neighboring Western countries. Following this logic, fragile states are in need of development in order to be able to provide security and basic services to its citizens, decreasing vulnerability and increasing resilience to internal and external shocks. In this way, fragile states exhibit a series of similar threats as failed states, but at a markedly lower magnitude. Their failures are an effective omen of what is to come if their administrative course remains unaltered.

Followed by many donor countries and international organisations and institutions, this approach has led to debate within academia and beyond. Some scholars deem the categorisation of states as fragile as useful, highlighting the potential to predict state collapse and assess the many possibilities to prevent it. Two main criticisms of this notion exist: I) the potential of abuse of the category of state fragility, legitimising external intervention at the expense of the local agency; II) the analytical utility of the categorization effort itself is disputed, with the state-centric grouping together of a wide range of diverse countries leading to highly standardised development responses that cannot take into account often highly divergent political, economic and social conditions.

== Indicators ==
The following factors are used by Fund For Peace to ascertain the status of a country.

=== Social ===
- Mounting demographic pressures and tribal, ethnic and/or religious conflicts.
- Massive internal and external displacement of refugees, creating severe humanitarian emergencies.
- Widespread vengeance-seeking group grievances.
- Chronic and sustained human flight.

=== Economic ===
- Widespread corruption
- High economic inequality
- Uneven economic development along group lines.
- Severe economic decline.

=== Political ===
- Delegitimization of the state.
- Deterioration of public services.
- Suspension or arbitrary application of law; widespread human rights abuses.
- Security forces operating as a "state within a state" often with impunity.
- Rise of factionalized elites.
- Intervention of external political agents and foreign states.

== Intergovernmental organisations and measures ==
Fragile states and post-conflict countries have participated in many intergovernmental groups and associations since the Second World War, including the Group of 77 and regional groups such as ASEAN and the African Union. However until recently countries affected by conflict had no dedicated international platform. In 2010 the g7+ was founded by a group of post-conflict countries to better represent their interests on the international stage. The g7+ is an intergovernmental organisation bringing together countries that have recent experience of conflict. The group aims to draw attention to the special challenges faced by fragile states, provides a platform for conflict-affected countries to come together to discuss their shared development challenges, and advocates for better international policies to address the needs of conflict-affected countries. The g7+ has created own index for measuring state fragility, identifying five clusters (political legitimacy, justice, security, economic foundation, revenue and services), which are located on a fragility spectrum consisting of five stages. Main differences with other indices are constituted by privileged role of individual, state-specific characteristics and self- rather than external assessment.

The Organization for Economic Cooperation and Development (OECD) has based its annual Fragile States Report, as of 2020 named "States of Fragility", on the US Fund for Peace's Fragile States Index, as well as on data from the World Bank (which publishes its own lists of fragile states), since 2005.

On a monthly basis, International Crisis Group (ICG), a transnational non-governmental organization (NGO), publishes CrisisWatch, a bulletin designed to inform readers about the development of state-based conflict across the globe. The reports indicate whether or not situations have improved, deteriorated, or remained unchanged from the previous month, and seek to highlight where there may be risks of new/escalated (or opportunities for resolution of) conflicts in the coming month.

== Origins ==
American international studies professor Joel Migdal looked into the relationship between state and society, where there is a disparity between the officially announced policies and the actual distribution of state resources. The list of countries included India, Mexico, Egypt and Sierra Leone etc. He traced this disparity to the lack of social control by the government - “the actual ability to make the operative rules of the game for people in the society." This not only includes existence of government agencies over the territory and extraction of resources but also the ability to appropriate resources and to regulate people's behavior.

Migdal stated the expansion of European economy and world trade in the 19th century led to drastic changes in people's strategies of survival in countries of Asia, Africa and Latin America. State policies enforced by Europeans, including land tenure laws, taxation and new modes of transportation, changed people's life situation and needs in these countries rapidly and deeply. Old rewards, sanctions and symbols became irrelevant under the new situation and previous social control and institutions were eroded.

However, unlike western Europe in the earlier centuries, these countries did not establish a new concentration of social control as the base of a strong and capable state. This is because although these countries had the necessary condition for creating a strong state - old social control weakened by the world trade before World War I - they did not have the sufficient conditions: 1) world historical timing that encourages concentrated social control; 2) military threat either from outside or within the country; 3) the basis for an independent bureaucracy; 4) skillful top leadership that would take advantage of all the above conditions.

== Basic services provision ==
There is a relationship between state fragility and service delivery and they are both seen as interrelated and mutually reinforcing, yet some also suggest that the provision of basic services can reduce state fragility. In fragile states service delivery may be impacted by financial constraints, limited expertise and a lack of information Long and protracted violence leads to the neglect and subsequent decay of the infrastructure required for provision. Governance and the breakdown of social order can also heighten the social exclusion of specific groups along ethnic, religious, political and gender lines. Such violence can be political, including conflict and terrorism, but can also be social or criminal, leading to a broad combination of security-based obstacles to effective service provision.

Education, health, access to water and adequate sanitation are important not only for survival, but are also recognised human rights whose provision is demonstrated to be necessary for a transition away from conflict. States can develop trust and legitimacy over the long term through the provision of these basic services (known as the "peace dividend"). Education, for instance, can protect children and non-combatants during conflict, facilitate intergenerational change and lead to the socialisation of children and youth, be a catalyst for broader transformation, as well as provide a sense of normalcy and continuity. Furthermore, the delivery of some of these services can be seen as more neutral, such as immunisation, and can lead to conflicting groups uniting on specific issues and further result in increased legitimacy.

However, how support is given to fragile states to provide these services is not so simple. Aid agencies who act independently of the state and provide parallel services risk undermining state legitimacy and capacity. On the other hand, supporting the state's own provision can be problematic as the state itself may be the cause of social divisions and a source of conflict.

Limited evidence of varying quality on basic services and social protection in conflicted affected situations has been found. Research into the gaps in provision, delivery and access of basic services has queried whether social protection interventions have contributed to state-building processes. It highlighted that this assumption has already significantly begun shaping policy and programmes and that state-building outcomes in policy may outweigh other outcomes like better water, healthcare and education.

== State building and peacebuilding ==
Whether or not to provide services in parallel is often framed as a debate between state building and peacebuilding. State building is argued to lead to peace when it involves seeking to develop an inclusive state, where legitimacy is built as the result of the state responding to the demands of all of society and providing public goods and services. However, supporting the state in this direction is not a simple task, especially for the following reasons:

- State-building may not automatically lead to peace as it is an inherently political process and will not automatically be inclusive or democratic.
- Political settlements that seek to appease those that threaten peace can strengthen the rule of repressive rulers.
- Political settlements that create power sharing agreements can weaken the state and lead to further entrenching divides.
- Focussing on state institutions may lead to overlooking domestic non-state actors, including traditional local leaders, and prevent the long term of a civil society.

Equally, peacebuilding efforts that do not include the state can undermine its ability to function. Researchers at the Overseas Development Institute emphasise the need for NGOs and other development actors to deepen knowledge of the context and maintain a constant awareness of the relationship between state- and peace-building. If NGOS and international organizations refuse to place additional authority on local state institutions, they risk creating an environment in which the perceived role of the state is less than what it ought to be as populations refuse to give newly constructed institutions necessary adherence.

=== Case study: Sierra Leone ===
The correct balance of state-building and peacebuilding has been argued to be highly elusive, even when peacebuilding and security have been achieved through the development of the state's own capacity. The UK government supported reforms in Sierra Leone along the principle of "security first" over the last decade, which is believed to have improved security, increased access to and the quality of justice, decreased corruption and positively reformed public service. Since the end of the civil war in 2002, there has been no major violence, peaceful elections were held in 2007 and there has been enough stability to help build sustainable institutions. Yet Sierra Leone suffers severe underdevelopment and ranked third to last on the UN Human Development Index for 2010. This in turn has created frustration and disappointment amongst the younger generation and poses a significant risk of a return to violence.

=== International intervention or autonomous recovery ===
Debates have been among scholars if post-conflict reconstruction intervention is the best strategy for state-building in fragile states. It is widely believed that multilateral intervention can interrupt the conflict trap of fragile states and set countries on a path toward postwar economic and political development. Responding to the failure of governance in fragile states, scholars have proposed new models of intervention, including neo-trusteeship and shared sovereignty. Supporters of International intervention encourage interventions led by the major powers or regional actors with the greatest national security or economic interest in restoring stability and democracy to the fragile state. They support developing agreements that authorize international intervention whereby the costs of third-party peacekeeping and state-building would increasingly be borne by the state being reconstructed.

Another kind of opinion has been the autonomous recovery - fragile states can recover from a conflict in the absence of intervention and may be able to develop effective institutions of government out of warfare. Supporters of autonomous recovery argue that international assistance and external support undermines the self-sustaining nature of the compact between rulers and constituents. Examples of Uganda, Eritrea, and Somalia support the theory of autonomous recovery, where these weak states successfully achieved a lasting peace, a systematic reduction in violence, and post-war political and economic development in the absence of international intervention.

=== Promoting democracy ===
According to Samuel Huntington, “The most important political distinction among countries concerns, not their form of government but their degree of government.” The purpose of democratization and institutional development in fragile states is to help them improve both state capacity and development of inclusive institutions. Knutsen and Nygard (2015) emphasize that semi-democracies (fragile states in our discussion) are less stable than both autocracies and democracies. In other words, once the process of democratization begins, it is dangerous to stop midway.

The purpose of democratization itself though is of concern before thinking about the means to achieve it. Ake (2000) says that democracy has mostly been analyzed in the context of its propensity to foster economic development. But in the context of its feasibility in Africa, the utility of democracy as measured by the “values, concerns and priorities of African peoples”, will determine to a considerable extent how far they will accept democracy. In general, the process of democratization is strongly mediated by normative values of the population of concern.

In order to design interventions aimed at promoting inclusive institutions when the status quo witnesses prevalently weak state structures, tractability of theoretically analyzing regime transitions is critical. But according to Geddes (1999), this is because different kinds of authoritarianism differ from each other as much they differ from democracy. To facilitate the analysis of these differences, she classifies authoritarian regimes as 'personalist', military, single-party, or amalgams of the pure types. All of them can be conceptualized from the perspective of “Limited Access Order” societies (North 1999).

According to Larry Diamond, in many of the fragile states promoting democracy is difficult simply because they lack the classic facilitating conditions for democracy—more developed levels of per capita income, civil society, independent mass media, political parties, mass democratic attitudes and values, and so on—but because they lack as well the more basic conditions of a viable political order. In these states, the challenge is not only (or in some cases, even at all) to pressure authoritarian state leaders to surrender power but rather to figure out how to regenerate legitimate power in the first place. The imperative is not only to empower citizens and their independent organizations but to endow state institutions as well with resources, training, organization, and a sense of a common mission.

One point of caution is that progress in democratization in fragile states are vulnerable. According to Samuels (2013), history has witnessed regime changes from democracy to autocracy during the periods of 1925-1945 [e.g. Germany (1933)] and 1960-1974 [e.g. Brazil (1964), Chile (1973)]. What he identifies as domestic causes of regime change are also the factors to be mitigated through institutional design. Some of these factors are civic culture, class conflicts arising from the unequal distribution of economic gains and military identity. Some of the international causes are the foreign policy of superpowers, the degree of participation in multilateral institutions, the extent of globalization and supranational impact of religious institutions on domestic political institutions.

== Non-state actors ==
Individuals in fragile states often rely on non-state actors such as chiefs, tribal elders, secret societies, gangs, militias, insurgents, community or religious leaders to meet their justice and security needs. Lisa Denney, of the Overseas Development Institute, therefore stresses the need for development donors to engage with these non-state actors when attempting to reform justice and security services in fragile states. She suggests four rules of engagement:

1. Accept that non-state actors are risky, but no more than many state partners
2. Be fit for purpose – non-state support needs different skills and procedures
3. Understand context
4. Only engage when it adds value

Non-state actors in a fragile state often compete for authority and legitimacy with both established federal institutions and other ambitious non-state actors.

== Private sector development ==
Researchers found little evidence in literature on the impact of private sector development (PSD) on state society relations and whether PSD and state relations meet public expectations. They thought one reason could be the lack of empirical data gathered from interviews and public surveys on the ground. The interlinkage of PSD on state society relations therefore definitely remain an area for further exploration and should receive greater attention in academic circles and among practitioners in respective publications. Key findings include:

- Legal reform requirements in fragile states' legal frameworks to boost Private sector Development are underestimated and deserve greater attention in development assistance. However, law-making is a long-term process and shouldn't violate tenets of representation and legitimacy.
- Although connections between economic growth and infrastructure are well established in literature, infrastructure project impact assessments that look beyond the first few years after a project are rare.
- Apart from the success in Cambodia the importance of instituting a solid labour rights regime in fragile states needs to be further explored. It's a balancing act to create labour rights and protect workers while maintaining flexibility to bring efficient levels of employment to foster PSD and for business.
- Microfinance isn't a one-stop solution to poverty reduction and depends on the fragile state in question.
- Corporate social responsibility (CSR) interventions can potentially do more harm than good and should not substitute government services or any other forms of development assistance.
- Lack of access to capital to launch business and a dearth of local financial institutions like reliable central banks remain a major constraints to PSD especially in sub-Saharan African fragile states.
- The literature reveals a mixed picture of the effects of foreign direct investment (FDI) on conflict and stability as success relies on context and environment.

== Relationships with other factors ==
=== Economic performance ===
A 2012 study by EPS-PEAKS investigated the relationship between state fragility, conflict and economic performance. It describes a large degree of variation among countries' experiences of conflict and foreign direct investment (FDI), with conflict accompanied by high levels of FDI in some countries and low levels of FDI in others. The study suggests that the majority of FDI in fragile states is driven by the motives of resource-seeking multinationals. While this investment can lead to economic growth, this potential is often not realised, and receiving investment solely for resource extraction can lead to further conflict: a phenomenon known as the resource curse.

If a state cannot tax reasonably or spend responsibly a key element of statehood is missing, claim researchers at the Overseas Development Institute and World Bank. They explain that substantial progress can be made in public financial management in fragile states, with most progress made on budget execution, though critical gaps remain in knowledge of the relationship between PFM, statehood and development progress.

An important economic component for failed states is reintegrating ex-fighters into society and the economy. Blattman and Annan conducted a study on how employment reduced risk of returning to violence for high-risk men after the Second Liberian Civil War. The study was on a program that provided agricultural training and capital inputs to the ex-fighters who still own rubber plantations or participated in illicit mining for precious minerals or logging. They found that the men responded well to agricultural training, reduced their illicit extraction of materials by roughly 20%, and about a quarter were less likely to be willing to fight in the election crisis in Côte d'Ivoire. However, the illicit activity did not stop completely. They also found that a promise of future returns was crucial in deterring men from fighting.

=== Climate change ===
A 2015 study, commissioned by the G7 member states, identifies seven climate-fragility risks that pose threats to the stability of states and societies in the decades ahead. The report finds that in fragile regions, where inequality persists and the government is unable to respond to stresses, the impacts of climate change on water, food and land will multiply existing pressures. It suggests that dynamics of state fragility, social and political fragility, may be exacerbated by climate change impacts and that the consequence of this is reduced adaptation capacity. A downward spiral of fragility or 'vicious climate-fragility cycle' begins. The report also describes how one can measure the capacity of states and societies to meet the challenges of environmental change along a 'spectrum of fragility', from 'most fragile' to 'most resilient'. In fragile situations, where the government lacks ability to carry out basic functions, the state is more vulnerable to and less able to cope with climate change pressures such as natural resource scarcity, land use change, extreme weather events or volatile food prices, and hence more at risk from further instability.

== Impacts ==
Weak states have been hypothesized to contribute to terrorist activity. English philosopher Thomas Hobbes was the first to make the connection between the strength of a state and violence. He opined that a strong state with a monopoly on force was the only way to avoid a war of "all against all". After the September 11 attacks, US President George W. Bush said that it "taught us that weak states, like Afghanistan, can pose as great a danger to our national interests as strong states. Poverty does not make poor people into terrorists and murderers. Yet poverty, weak institutions, and corruption can make weak states vulnerable to terrorist networks and drug cartels within their borders". The link between weak states and terrorism has been disputed. In 2003, historian Walter Laqueur noted that a majority of poor, weak states had almost no terrorist activity.

Weak states may also be more vulnerable to public health crises such as infectious disease, which can have spillover effects on other countries.

== See also ==
- Crime statistics – Quantitative data on criminal behavior
- Crisis States Research Centre
- Democracy and economic growth
- Democracy indices – Overview of democracy measures
- Failed state – State that has lost its ability to govern
- Fragile States Index – Annual report for politically vulnerable countries
- Ochlocracy – Democracy spoiled by demagoguery and the rule of passion over reason
- Rogue state – Country considered a threat to world peace
- Stabilization of fragile states
