= State collapse =

Catastrophic government dissolution

State collapse is the catastrophic breakdown of a sovereign state's institutional apparatus, resulting in the inability to sustain a monopoly on the legitimate use of force.

During periods of state collapse, a provisional government may be formed, particularly where whatever circumstances have caused the first stages of state collapse have resulted in a coup d'état. Regimes attempting to avert state collapse may become increasingly violent and paranoid, resulting in civil society actors and local leaders losing trust in the ability of the central government to exercise effective control and choosing to defend their interests militarily. Neighboring states or great powers may interfere politically, sometime supporting rebel groups. As a result of the collapse of the central government's ability to effectuate economic regulation and taxation, the informal economy becomes dominant, resulting in declining government resources and a vicious cycle of reduction in state capacity.

== Definitions and examples ==
While the definitions of "failed state" and "fragile state" have been contested for being "too broad and too vague", foreign policy experts such as Charles T. Call have advocated focusing on extreme cases of "collapsed states" instead, defined as "countries whose state apparatus ceases to exist for a period of several months". According to Call, between 1995 and 2005, the main examples of collapsed states included Somalia, which had a sustained collapse from 1990 to 2004; the Soviet Union in 1991; Yugoslavia in 1992; and possibly Afghanistan from 1992 to 1995.

Recent scholarship has focused on identifying measurable dimensions of state capacity, building on the institutionalist approach associated with Max Weber. Daniel Lambach, Eva Johais, and Markus Bayer have thus defined state collapse as the inability to: make and enforce binding rules; maintain a monopoly on violence; and collect taxes. Using this framework, Lambach et al. identified 17 collapsed states between 1960 and 2007. The majority of cases were in sub-Saharan Africa, involving armed rebellions in countries including Chad, Uganda, Liberia, Somalia, Angola, Zaire, Guinea-Bissau, and Sierra Leone, plus Congo-Kinshasa, which collapsed following decolonization from Belgium. The dissolution of the Soviet Union led to state collapse in Georgia, Bosnia-Herzegovina, and Tajikistan. Other cases of state collapse included Laos, following an attack backed by the United States which led to partitioning of the country into spheres of influence; Lebanon, which went through a full-scale civil war; and Afghanistan, where insurgents challenged the communist regime and moved against Soviet intervention.

== Theories and causes ==
In 2020, Johais, Bayer and Lambach proposed a dynamic model of the causes of state collapse. In their article in Global Change, Peace & Security, they argue that a state collapse happens when 1) opposition groups arm themselves and mobilise against the government; 2) political transitions such as decolonisation or regime change cause existing power structures to be questioned; 3) politics prolong power struggles and undermine existing institutions; 4) repression causes extreme distrust between rulers and the rest of society; 5) factionalism obstructs strengthening of state policies; 6) loss of cohesion within the ruling elite erodes the monopolisation of violence, rule-making, and tax collection; and 7) external interventions contribute to destabilisation.

=== Cyclical theories ===
Islamic scholar Ibn Khaldun (1332–1406) produced a general theory of state collapse, transforming the study of history into a "new science". In his eyes, dynasties repeatedly become "sedentary, senile, coercive, pompous, subservient to desire ... liable to divisions in the dynasty." Group feeling (asabiyyah, groupthink) disappears as the dynasty grows senile. After three generations a new invading clique, "restless, alert and courageous", will cause the old dynasty to collapse in accordance with the principle in the Book of Exodus, chapter 20, verse four: God "visits the sins of the fathers onto their children, even unto the third and fourth generation of those that hate Him". Ibn Khaldun was fatalistic: "This senility is a chronic disease which cannot be cured because it is something natural". Professor Geoff Mulgan discusses Ibn Khaldun in detail and agrees on the timescale: "There are obvious parallels between the lifespans of individuals and those of ruling groups."

In the case of the USSR, a Marxist revolutionary wave had formed in which several subordinate regimes in Eastern Europe and Africa collapsed almost simultaneously with the central power.

=== Mass psychology ===
The Japanese philosopher Hajime Tanabe points to the quasi-religious role of the state to mediate between mortal individuals and the eternal universe, so that states regularly collapse; like religious figures, they must undergo a process of death and resurrection. In his view this may account for the perennial popularity of states because they regularly demonstrate their ability to transcend death.

Psychologists speak of a "Masada complex" that may drive fanatics to a suicidal, violent last-ditch stand. In a totalitarian state or an ideocracy, individuals may develop a closed mind and an authoritarian personality, making them more likely to resist threats to the incumbent regime.

According to psychologist Erich Fromm it is possible for an entire nation, if they all share the same vices and errors, to become insane—a "folie a millions". Inhumane treatment by the rulers inevitably leads to collapse;

Despots and ruling cliques can succeed in dominating and exploiting their fellow man ... but their subjects react ... with apathy, impairment of intelligence, initiative and skills ... or they react by the accumulation of such hate and destructiveness as to bring about an end to themselves, their rulers and their system. ... if man lives under conditions contrary to his nature and to human growth and sanity, he cannot help reacting.'

=== Democratic decay ===
Mark Blyth alleges that a democracy can also collapse "if voters don't get what they want and merely affirm the status quo." In these circumstances, voters deprived of real choice may opt for the least democratic option. In a divided, collapsing country lacking civil institutions, or in a closed country attempting reform and openness, the process of democratisation is 'dangerous' and may hasten collapse.

=== Increasing coercion and dictatorship ===
In the USSR and Apartheid South Africa, the state became 'evil or tyrannical... destroying the institutions of civil society'; and in Somalia between 1970 and 1991, Siad Barre changed from 'prophetic rule, to autocracy, to tyranny'. In this context John Kenneth Galbraith regrets the "very slight" amount of research on the nature of political power. Power regularly passes to those who "assert the unknown with the greatest conviction... not necessarily related to intelligence." What we call "power" is, "in practice, the illusion of power." Discussing how the "powerless" Mahatma Gandhi brought about the collapse of militarily "powerful" British India, Galbraith reflects that power, mostly seen as a possession of states and their leaders, would be better viewed as a flow, into and away from "those instruments that enforce it". Martin Wight deplored the "demonic concentrations of power" of the defeated countries in the two world wars. A devout Christian, he saw their "triumphant self-destruction" as "Antichrist moments".

=== Messianic leadership style ===
According to political scientists, in an ideocracy there must be a ruthless charismatic leader: "the leader is the movement", and all individuals are required to submit to, and worship him. "Followers who lead barren, insecure, frustrated lives obey the leader, not through faith in his vision of a 'Promised land', but because he leads them away from their unwanted selves". When collapse threatens he may insist on a "fight to the finish".

Hitler, according to Walter Langer, had a Messiah complex and saw himself as the "Saviour of Germany" who performed "miracles" with the economy. He was unnaturally fond of his mother, to the extent that Germany became a "mother symbol". His drive to destroy (the Jews, communism, Europe) was an unconscious attempt to resolve his Oedipus complex and the injustices of his childhood. He "dismantled the German state ... and replaced it with a war machine". He was swept along by a tide of events.

Mussolini, according to Denis Mack Smith, "was an actor, playing the part that Italians wanted him to be". He was vindictive, sadistic, impulsive, proud and cruel, full of "demonic wilfulness" and did not know right from wrong. When in 1944 he led a puppet state in northern Italy, he "divided Italy in two and initiated 18 months of terrible civil war." Ken Livingstone has compared Slobodan Milošević to Hitler for his racism and expansionist goals. Saddam Hussein, who also suffered from a Messiah complex, was similar: "Hitler was not one of a kind. As long as millions of people passionately long for his return, it is only a matter of time until their wish is fulfilled."

Nicolae Ceaușescu "went mad" as early as 1971 according to John Sweeney, when, "blind to his own Messianism", he attempted to recreate North Korean totalitarianism in Romania. He "played the king" and the role of "chosen one" and "saviour".

=== Neglect, corruption and incompetence ===
Managerial incapacity, failing to meet popular needs, causes dissatisfaction. If the government avoids necessary choices, practices only defensive politics, and represses the protests with tyranny, the state is likely to implode. This was the case in Chad when it collapsed in 1980, and in Ghana in 1981.

Nicholas II, crowned Russian Emperor at the early age of 26, was unprepared for governance. His cousin Cyril, son of Grand Duke Vladimir, was a rival candidate for the throne. Both liberals and revolutionaries challenged his autocracy. By 1916 he had become apathetic, dominated by his wife, Tsarita Alexandra Feodorovna, and Rasputin, a "Christ in the image of the rejected and agonizing monarchy".

Few political scientists credibly predicted the collapse of the Soviet Union or agreed on its causes: in hindsight, Leonid Fituni lists "poverty, hunger, regional conflicts, ethnic wars, deindustrialisation, foreign debt, elite corruption, disease epidemics, refugee problems, environmental issues" as causes.

=== Military takeover ===
Armed forces may take over a collapsing state by coup d'etat. Some military regimes are able to reverse a downward spiral, but if they fail to do so, must rely ever more on coercion and control. The regime "falls into the vacuum it has created". This occurred in Uganda under Idi Amin in 1979 and in Somalia in 1991.

=== Absence of legitimacy ===
Legitimacy refers to popular belief in, or acceptance of, an authority; thus it includes any leader achieving popularity at any given moment. When the state fails to reward the people with civil rights, participation, accountability and oversight, legitimacy fades and collapse may occur In Afghanistan, the non-inclusive 2004 constitution, the international coalition's focus on power consolidation at the expense of democracy, and president Ashraf Ghani's narrow circle of support, caused the regime to fall in 2021 as it 'lacked legitimacy in the eyes of the people'. In the USSR the 1991 Soviet coup d'etat attempt was foiled, not by the Gorbachev regime but by Boris Yeltsin and other reformers: Gorbachev never recovered from this blow to his legitimacy

=== Newly independent states ===
Such states are especially vulnerable to collapse as the people may not accept or understand the principles of legitimacy or nationhood. In Mozambique, the FRELIMO government lost legitimacy when the army refused to fight in the civil war. State collapse is prevalent in much of post-colonial Africa and has occurred in two waves: in the 1980s, the second decade of independence, in Chad, Uganda and Ghana; and a decade later, in Somalia and Liberia.

=== Other states subvert or invade ===
Collapse is marked by the loss of control of political space. Neighbour states may intervene directly in a collapsing state; or they may host dissident movements. The collapse of Afghanistan in 2021 was only possible because the Taliban were sheltered in Pakistan. Idi Amin was forced out of Uganda by Ugandan exiles combined with the invasion by Tanzania.

=== Economic collapse or decline ===
In a collapsing state, the economy may shrink because a) the black economy overshadows the formal, more controlled economy, and b) peripheral areas may prefer to use a neighbour state's currency, as in Chad, Ethiopia in the 1980s and Zaire in the 1990s. In the case of post-WWI Austria, the loss of pre-war markets in the Austro-Hungarian Empire encouraged fears of economic decline, thus the idea of Anschluss with Germany, and Austria's downfall by German invasion in 1938.

In the Soviet Union, the dramatic drop of the price of oil in 1985 and 1986 and the Reagan administration's escalation of the arms race ("they can't sustain military spending the way we can") overstretched the USSR economy, while the economy of apartheid South Africa was weakened by sanctions, banking and other boycotts, divestment and shareholder activism. Particularly in South Africa, this led to fears of imminent civil war between the Apartheid government and the African National Congress. Given South Africa's failure to achieve its aims in the Border War and the recent memory of the Rhodesian Bush War, which resulted in the defeat of Rhodesia by similar African nationalist rebels, it was far from clear that the central government could sustain war production sufficient to defeat a rebel army. This, combined with other factors, pushed the F. W. de Klerk government to begin a settlement process which led to a period of democratic transition leading up to the 1994 general election, the first held under universal suffrage.

=== Ethnic and regional tensions ===
Loss of territorial control is a key indicator of state collapse. If local leaders feel neglected, they may fan the flames of ethnic, religious or regional tensions to the point of rebellion. If civil war results, the state loses its ability to sustain its monopoly on violence, and rebel groups become able to exercise military control. If separatist rebels are able to establish sustained control over part of the country, they may proclaim a new independent state, forming (with varying degrees of success) a new state and establishing a separate local monopoly on violence. The Socialist Federal Republic of Yugoslavia collapsed in the 1990s, when its six federated republics broke apart to become separate countries; though Slovenia and Macedonia detached from Belgrade peacefully, civil wars broke out in Croatia, Bosnia and Kosovo, then part of Serbia, due to nationalist elites manipulating communal tensions.

The ethnic discrimination of the apartheid system in South Africa ended through negotiations between the governing National Party, the African National Congress, and other political organizations, resulting in South Africa's first non-racial election, which was won by the African National Congress.

=== Foreign war ===
"Misbegotten wars, when serving as culmination points of more general national decline, can be fatal", says Robert Kaplan. Participation in World War I was a decisive factor in the collapse of Ottoman Turkey, the Austro-Hungarian empire and the Russian empire in 1917.

=== Wars of succession ===
In an absolute monarchy, a disputed succession to the throne can cause the utter collapse of royal authority. The Wars of the Roses ended the Lancastrian dynasty at the battle of Tewkesbury in 1471 and led to the downfall of Richard III and the Yorkist line at the battle of Bosworth in 1485.

=== Dependence on outside support ===
In Angola in the 1980s, aid from the USSR was the "principal cause of collapse", turning the ruling elite into unpopular "worshippers of foreign divinities". Soon afterwards, the USSR itself collapsed, in part due to the "demands of the main sponsor", the USA. The 2010 Haiti earthquake caused a surge in aid which created a huge parallel government run by NGOs and contractors; destroyed weak institutions; inflated wages, rents, and prices beyond the reach of local businesses; and gave the Haitian government no incentive to undertake necessary reforms.

== Regeneration ==
Either the incumbent regime itself, or an extremist reactionary group dissatisfied with its performance, may attempt to postpone or avoid collapse by regenerating popular support. "At the end of a dynasty there often appears some show of power giving the impression that the dynasty's senility has been made to disappear. It lights up brilliantly just before it is extinguished, like a candle which leaps up brilliantly just before it is put out."

To do so, they may have to take "heroic" measures. "Throughout history there have always been in the event of defeat two paths of action; the one aims at saving enough of the substance as possible, the other at leaving behind a stirring legend." According to Piekalkiewicz and Penn, they may rethink or adapt the ideology, or replace it by a completely new set of ideals. For example, in Poland, according to Piekalkiewicz and Penn, communist ideocracy failed in 1980; the recognition of Lech Wałęsa's Solidarity trade union led to a military coup and authoritarian military rule.

According to Sabrina Ramet, regenerative changes occurred in Yugoslavia in the 1980s when the communist ideology was replaced by a nationalist drive for a Greater Serbia and by an anti-bureaucratic revolution in support of Slobodan Milosevic. The Young Turk coup of 1908, the 1991 Soviet coup d'etat attempt, and the financial and industrial reforms of Sergei Witte in Imperial Russia were all aimed at regenerating causes which were nearing collapse.

Marina Ottaway discusses the collapse of the Austro-Hungarian Empire and Ottoman Empire in 1918, British India in 1947, the collapse of the Soviet Union in 1991, the collapse of South Africa's white supremacist government in 1993, of Czechoslovakia the following year, and of Yugoslavia.

== Possible consequences of collapse ==
State collapse is not necessarily anarchy.

=== Failed state ===
If attempts at restructuring from within or without are unsuccessful, a long-term absence of a viable government results. Services are absent and national borders are unprotected, as in Haiti, Libya, Somalia, Yemen and South Sudan. A failed state can fragment, be taken over by outside forces, or descend into chaos.

=== Annexation by another state ===
The Mongol Empire was able to conquer and unite the various kingdoms and empires spanning China into one state again in 1279, due to a lack of centralised state authority over the previous century of disunity.

The gradual weakening and collapse of the Byzantine Empire starting in the 11th century led to territory being occupied by European and Ottoman powers, accelerating the total failure of the state.

The collapse in authority and failure of other states such as the Golden Horde led to their territorial occupation by other states, in this case Russia.

=== Fragmentation ===
The partition of India in 1947 led to the creation of two independent nations, India and Pakistan. When Ottoman Turkey collapsed at the end of World War I, it lost territory, including what became Syria, Iraq and Palestine; the collapse of the Austro-Hungarian empire gave rise to Czechoslovakia, Hungary and the Austrian Republic, while Slovenia and Croatia became part of Yugoslavia. Nazi Germany in 1945 fragmented into East and West Germany, while Pomerania and Silesia became part of Poland. The USSR breakup led to regional wars in the newly created states of Tajikistan, Moldova, Azerbaijan and Georgia.

=== Genocide ===
The prospect, and chaos, of state collapse provides fearful elites with motive and opportunity to kill en masse (though the planning and implementation of genocide may be hampered by reduced resources). When defeat appeared inevitable, Hitler ordered the killing of invalids, Gypsies, Slavs, and Jews in the Final solution. In Ottoman Turkey, estimates for the death toll in the Armenian genocide vary between 300,000 and 1.5 million.

The Partition of India displaced between 10 and 12 million Sikhs, Hindus and Muslims, creating overwhelming refugee crises; there was large-scale violence, with estimates of loss of life accompanying or preceding the partition disputed and varying between several hundred thousand and two million. (Note: "The death toll remains disputed with figures ranging from 200,000 to 2 million.") In the former Yugoslavia, collapse led to state failure, and ethnic cleansing and genocide erupted.

=== Ethnic cleansing, Refugee crisis or Diaspora ===
State collapse in most cases incurs humanitarian tragedies, ending in massive outflows of refugees and others. Africa leads the world in refugee crises, especially in Somalia and Rwanda, and elsewhere, Bosnia, Libya and Haiti. Earlier examples include: the flight and expulsion of Germans (1944-1950) from areas now part of Poland or Russia; the Revival Process when the People's Republic of Bulgaria collapsed; the White emigres who left Russia after the Czarist regime fell; and the South African diaspora after the collapse of apartheid.

=== Reconstruction and regime change ===
Collapsed states are now expected to be rebuilt, territorially intact and along democratic lines, with the help of multilateral organizations and bilateral donors. State reconstruction involves five basic elements: 1) a central political authority, 2) control of borders, 3) control of national territory, 4) sufficient control and supply of resources to maintain the state, 5) availability of state agents sufficient to execute policy. Anyone attempting this in Somalia would have to disarm thousands of gunmen, stop the arms trafficking, set up a justice system and rebuild the economy, all against the opposition of warlords, extremists and smugglers.

In 1946, the Diet ratified a new Constitution of Japan The new constitution drafted by Americans allowed access and control over the Japanese military through MacArthur and the Allied occupation of Japan. "The political project drew much of its inspiration from the U.S. Bill of Rights, New Deal social legislation, the liberal constitutions of several European states and even the Soviet Union."

=== Justice, guilt and denialism ===
Collapse may be followed by formal or informal efforts at justice, such as the Nuremberg trials and the Truth and Reconciliation Commission (South Africa). Slobodan Milosevic and Saddam Hussein were also tried in court. Germany has faced up to its German collective guilt and "legacy of shame" for the Hitler years in such media portrayals as Downfall. Denial has been a common reaction in post-collapse nations. In post-apartheid South Africa, white liberals were more likely to feel guilt than conservatives. Some have refused to accept responsibility for massacres, as in Holocaust denial, the Myth of the clean Wehrmacht and Armenian genocide denial. A negationist explanation for the collapse of the German Empire in 1918 was found in the Stab-in-the-back myth.

=== In the longer term ===
The collapse of the Ottomans in 1918 had long-term consequences, "triggering most of the problems that plague the Middle East today". Hegemony in the Middle East has been subject to quarrels between British, French, Israeli, American, Arab nationalist, Saudi and Iranian interests ever since.

Sebastian Haffner had argued that Hitler, "whether we like it or not", created many features of the postwar world, including the state of Israel, the end of European empires, the division of Germany, and the joint hegemony of the US and USSR.

== See also ==
- Active measures (covert operations)
- Anarchy (international relations)
- The Anatomy of Revolution
- Collapsology
- Cycle of violence
- Failed state
- Fragile state
  - Fragile States Index
- Goliath's Curse
- Historic recurrence
- History of the Central Intelligence Agency (covert operations)
- International relations
- Lebanese liquidity crisis
- American decline
- Power politics
- Predictions of the collapse of the Soviet Union
- Siege mentality
- Speaking truth to power
- The Tragedy of Great Power Politics
- Thucydides Trap
- United States involvement in regime change
- Societal collapse
- Debellatio
- Dissolution (politics)
