= List of countries by Fragile States Index =

Ranking of countries by political stability

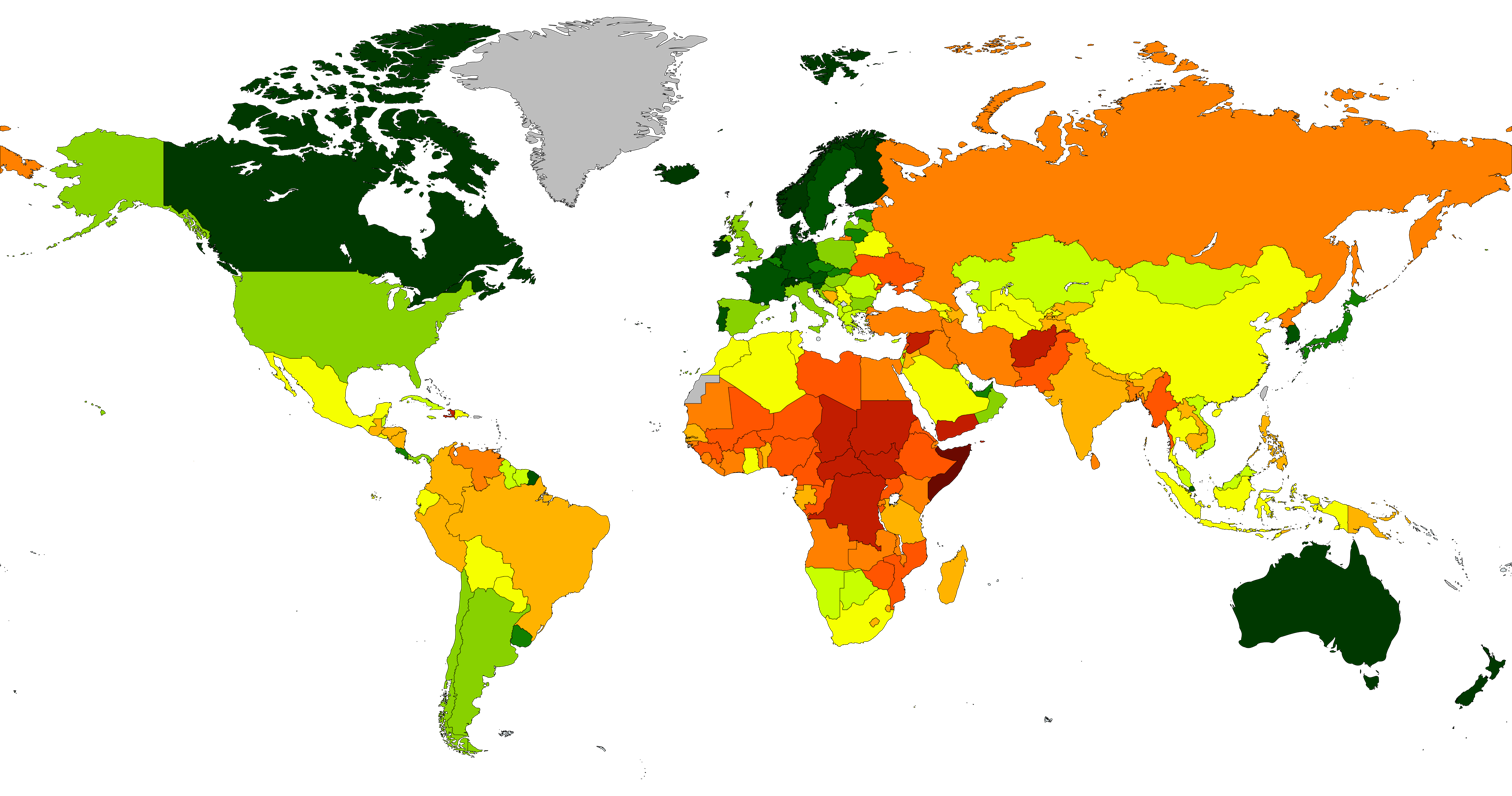
Countries according to the 2024 Fragile States Index Very high alert High alert Alert High warning Elevated warning Warning Stable More stable Very stable Sustainable Very sustainable Data unavailable

This article consists of a list of countries by order of appearance in the Fragile States Index (FSI; formerly called the Failed States Index) of the American think tank Fund for Peace.

A fragile state has several attributes. Common indicators include state whose central government is so weak or ineffective that it has little practical control over much of its territory; non-provision of public services; widespread corruption and criminality; refugees and involuntary movement of populations; and sharp economic decline. Since 2005, the index has been published annually by the Fund for Peace and the magazine Foreign Policy. The list has been cited by journalists and academics in making broad comparative points about countries or regions.

The report uses 12 factors to determine the rating for each nation, including security threats, economic implosion, human rights violations and refugee flows.

== Indicators of a fragile state ==
Fund For Peace ranks (between 0 and 10) the following factors to determine the overall status of a country on the index.

- Cohesion
  - Security apparatus
  - Factionalized elites
  - Group grievance
- Economic
  - Economic decline and poverty
  - Uneven development
  - Human flight and brain drain
- Political
  - State legitimacy
  - Public services
  - Human rights and rule of law
- Social
  - Demographic pressures
  - Refugees and internally displaced persons
- Cross-cutting
  - External intervention

== Fragile States Index (2024) ==
The table below shows the FSI for 2024, with comparisons of each country's current score to previous years' indices. A higher score (with a maximum of 120) indicates a weaker, more vulnerable, or more fragile situation in the country.

Rank	Country	2024 score	Change from 2023	Change from 2022	Change from 2021	Change from 2020	Change from 2019	Change from 2018
1	Somalia	111.3	▼0.6	▲0.8	▲0.4	▲0.4	▼1.0	▼1.9
2	Sudan	109.3	▲3.1	▲2.2	▲4.1	▲4.5	▲1.3	▲0.6
3	South Sudan	109.0	▲0.5	▲0.6	▼0.4	▼1.8	▼3.2	▼4.4
4	Syria	108.1	▲1.0	▼0.3	▼2.6	▼2.6	▼3.4	▼3.3
5	DR Congo	106.7	▼0.5	▼0.6	▼1.7	▼2.7	▼3.5	▼4.0
6	Yemen	106.6	▼2.3	▼5.1	▼5.1	▼5.8	▼6.9	▼6.1
7	Afghanistan	103.9	▼2.7	▼2.0	▲1.8	▲1.0	▼1.1	▼2.7
7	Central African Republic	103.9	▼1.8	▼4.2	▼3.1	▼3.6	▼5.0	▼7.2
9	Haiti	103.5	▲0.6	▲3.8	▲6.0	▲5.8	▲4.2	▲1.5
10	Chad	102.7	▼1.9	▼3.0	▼3.1	▼3.7	▼5.8	▼5.6
11	Myanmar	100.0	▼0.2	Steady	▲6.2	▲6.0	▲5.7	▲3.9
12	Ethiopia	98.1	▼2.3	▼1.2	▼0.9	▲3.5	▲3.9	▼1.5
13	Palestine (Note: Prior to the 2021 index, Israel and Palestine (West Bank) were scored as a single state.)	97.8	▲9.9	▲12.2	▲11.8	n/a	n/a	n/a
14	Mali	97.3	▼2.2	▼1.3	▲0.7	▲1.3	▲2.8	▲3.7
15	Nigeria	96.6	▼1.4	▼0.6	▼1.4	▼0.7	▼1.9	▼3.3
16	Libya	96.5	▲0.4	▲2.2	▼0.5	▲1.3	▲4.3	▲1.9
17	Guinea	96.4	▼2.1	▼3.2	▼1.0	▼0.8	▼3.0	▼5.2
18	Zimbabwe	95.7	▼1.2	▼2.1	▼3.4	▼3.5	▼3.8	▼6.6
19	Niger	95.2	▲1.8	Steady	▼0.8	▼0.1	▼1.0	▼1.0
20	Cameroon	94.3	▲0.3	▼1.7	▼2.9	▼3.6	▼2.7	▼1.0
21	Burkina Faso	94.2	▲0.2	▲3.7	▲7.1	▲8.3	▲10.3	▲7.7
22	Ukraine	93.1	▼2.8	▲24.5	▲23.3	▲24.1	▲22.1	▲20.5
23	Lebanon	92.7	▲0.9	▲1.4	▲3.7	▲8.0	▲7.7	▲5.9
24	Burundi	92.6	▼1.6	▼2.8	▼4.5	▼5.3	▼5.6	▼4.8
25	Mozambique	92.5	▼1.5	▼1.8	▼1.4	▲0.8	▲3.8	▲3.8
26	Eritrea	92.1	▼2.4	▼3.8	▼4.9	▼3.7	▼4.3	▼5.1
27	Pakistan	91.7	▲1.8	▲2.0	▲1.2	▼0.4	▼2.5	▼4.6
28	Uganda	91.1	▼0.4	▼1.0	▼1.8	▼1.7	▼4.2	▼4.0
29	Congo-Brazzaville	90.2	▼0.5	▼2.0	▼2.2	▼1.9	▼2.3	▼2.9
30	Venezuela	89.0	▼1.5	▼2.6	▼3.6	▼2.2	▼0.3	▲2.8
31	Iraq	88.6	▼2.8	▼5.2	▼7.6	▼7.3	▼10.5	▼13.6
32	Guinea-Bissau	88.4	▼1.5	▼2.9	▼3.6	▼4.5	▼7.1	▼9.7
33	Sri Lanka	88.2	▼2.1	▲8.9	▲7.7	▲6.4	▲4.2	▲3.3
34	Mauritania	87.0	Steady	▼0.9	▼2.1	▼1.7	▼3.1	▼5.2
35	Liberia	86.9	▼2.0	▼1.3	▼2.6	▼3.1	▼3.3	▼5.7
36	Kenya	86.5	▼1.3	▼1.7	▼2.7	▼3.8	▼7.0	▼10.9
37	Bangladesh	85.9	▲0.7	▲1.4	▲0.9	▲0.2	▼1.8	▼4.4
38	Angola	85.6	▼1.3	▼2.5	▼3.4	▼1.7	▼2.2	▼3.8
39	Ivory Coast	85.3	▼1.8	▼4.3	▼5.4	▼4.4	▼6.8	▼9.3
40	North Korea	84.9	▼2.1	▼4.2	▼5.1	▼5.3	▼7.8	▼8.3
41	Turkey	84.0	▲2.8	▲5.9	▲4.3	▲4.9	▲3.7	▲1.8
42	Equatorial Guinea	83.7	▼0.7	▼0.4	▼0.4	▲0.7	▲1.1	▲0.3
43	Iran	82.9	▼2.5	▼1.2	▼1.6	▼0.5	▼0.1	▼1.4
44	Egypt	82.8	▲1.2	▼0.8	▼2.2	▼3.2	▼5.6	▼5.9
45	Sierra Leone	82.6	▲1.2	▲0.2	▼0.8	▼1.8	▼4.2	▼6.5
46	Rwanda	81.8	▼0.5	▼1.9	▼3.2	▼4.2	▼5.7	▼7.5
47	Comoros	81.7	▼0.5	▼0.6	▼0.8	▲0.5	Steady	▼0.9
48	Djibouti	81.6	▼0.6	▲0.3	▼0.8	▼1.1	▼3.5	▼5.5
48	Russia	81.6	▲0.9	▲9.0	▲8.0	▲9.0	▲6.9	▲4.4
50	Zambia	81.2	▼0.6	▼2.4	▼3.7	▼3.3	▼4.5	▼6.0
51	Togo	81.1	▼1.0	▼2.5	▼4.0	▼4.7	▼6.3	▼4.1
52	Malawi	80.5	▼2.7	▼2.5	▼2.7	▼3.5	▼2.8	▼5.0
53	Madagascar	79.8	▼1.9	▼0.6	▲0.3	▲0.3	▼1.1	▼3.8
54	Papua New Guinea	78.8	▲0.7	▼0.7	▼2.1	▼3.5	▼4.3	▼6.0
55	Cambodia	78.6	▼1.7	▼1.9	▼2.0	▼1.7	▼3.9	▼5.4
56	Honduras	78.1	▼1.5	▼0.6	▼1.3	▲1.3	▲0.3	▲0.8
57	Nepal	78.0	▼2.2	▼2.6	▼4.2	▼4.6	▼6.7	▼9.9
58	Eswatini	77.6	▼1.5	▼2.8	▼4.9	▼5.4	▼7.7	▼9.9
58	Solomon Islands	77.6	▼2.0	▼2.8	▼1.7	▼2.1	▼4.3	▼5.5
60	Nicaragua	76.7	▼1.0	▼1.0	▼0.4	▼0.4	▼1.4	▲1.4
61	Gambia	76.1	Steady	▼2.5	▼4.4	▼6.1	▼7.8	▼11.0
62	Tanzania	75.7	▼0.9	▼2.5	▼3.6	▼2.4	▼4.4	▼3.7
63	Colombia	75.6	▼2.5	▼2.8	▼3.7	▼1.0	▼0.1	▼1.0
64	Philippines	75.1	▼2.7	▼5.4	▼7.3	▼5.9	▼8.0	▼10.4
65	Guatemala	74.9	▼2.4	▼2.6	▼4.5	▼4.3	▼6.5	▼6.9
65	Kyrgyzstan	74.9	▼0.7	▼2.2	▼1.5	▲1.0	▼1.3	▼3.7
67	East Timor	74.8	▼2.7	▼4.5	▼6.1	▼7.9	▼10.7	▼13.5
68	Lesotho	74.6	▼1.7	▼2.8	▼3.3	▼3.7	▼5.1	▼5.5
69	Jordan	74.3	▼1.4	▼2.3	▼2.5	▼1.1	▼1.6	▼2.5
70	Senegal	74.2	▲2.7	▲2.1	▲0.8	▼0.4	▼3.0	▼5.4
71	Laos	73.8	▼0.9	▼1.7	▼2.2	▼3.1	▼4.9	▼6.9
72	Azerbaijan	72.8	▲0.1	▼0.3	▼2.3	▲1.5	▼0.4	▼1.8
72	Tajikistan	72.8	▼1.4	▼2.2	▼2.3	▼2.7	▼4.9	▼6.7
74	Benin	72.5	▼0.8	Steady	▼0.3	Steady	▼1.1	▼3.2
75	India	72.3	▼1.8	▼3.0	▼4.7	▼3.0	▼2.1	▼4.0
76	Peru	72.0	▼1.1	▲2.2	▲0.6	▲4.4	▲3.8	▲1.9
77	Bosnia-Herzegovina	71.0	▼1.3	▼2.0	▼1.9	▲0.8	▼0.3	▼0.3
78	Brazil	70.3	▼4.2	▼3.6	▼5.5	▼2.7	▼1.5	▲1.6
79	Gabon	70.2	▲4.7	▲3.5	▲2.8	▲1.1	▼0.3	▼2.3
80	South Africa	69.6	▼2.4	▼2.4	▼0.4	▼0.5	▼1.5	▼3.3
81	Bolivia	69.4	▼1.3	▼4.0	▼5.5	▼5.6	▼3.5	▼5.8
82	Georgia	69.3	▼2.6	▼2.5	▼3.3	▼1.9	▼2.7	▼4.7
83	Mexico	69.0	▼0.8	▼1.3	▼0.9	▲1.8	▼0.7	▼2.5
84	Morocco	68.8	▲0.6	▼1.3	▼2.7	▼2.4	▼4.2	▼5.2
85	Belarus	68.7	▼1.2	Steady	▲0.7	▲2.9	▲0.5	▼1.8
85	El Salvador	68.7	▼0.6	▼2.1	▼2.9	▼0.2	▼1.1	▼2.5
87	Algeria	68.6	▼1.4	▼3.6	▼5.0	▼6.0	▼6.8	▼7.2
88	São Tomé and Príncipe	68.5	▼1.2	▼1.9	▼3.0	▼1.8	▼2.6	▼3.6
89	Armenia	68.1	▲0.6	▲1.1	▼1.7	▲3.9	▲1.4	▼1.4
90	Ecuador	68.0	▼1.4	▼1.1	▼3.2	▼1.4	▼3.2	▼6.2
91	Serbia	67.8	▼0.1	Steady	▲0.4	▲1.7	▼0.2	▼0.3
92	Tunisia	67.2	▲0.8	▼1.0	▼2.0	▼0.9	▼2.9	▼4.9
93	F.S. Micronesia	66.9	▼2.4	▼4.1	▼4.8	▼4.3	▼6.1	▼7.5
94	Fiji	66.4	▼3.8	▼2.5	▼4.0	▼3.5	▼5.3	▼8.1
95	Thailand	66.2	▼1.8	▼3.8	▼4.7	▼4.6	▼6.9	▼8.8
96	Uzbekistan	64.8	▼2.0	▼4.8	▼7.2	▼8.3	▼10.9	▼14.3
97	Moldova	64.7	▼2.7	▲0.2	▼2.3	▼1.3	▼2.4	▼4.8
98	Bhutan	64.5	▼1.9	▼2.9	▼3.8	▼5.0	▼7.5	▼9.8
99	China	64.4	▼0.7	▼2.5	▼4.5	▼5.5	▼6.7	▼8.0
100	Bahrain	64.2	▼0.9	▼2.4	▼2.5	▲0.3	▲0.4	▼0.2
101	Samoa	63.9	▼1.2	▼0.9	▼0.3	▲0.6	▼0.3	▼1.6
102	Indonesia	63.7	▼1.9	▼2.9	▼3.9	▼4.1	▼6.7	▼8.6
103	Saudi Arabia	63.2	▼2.1	▼4.3	▼6.5	▼5.6	▼7.2	▼7.0
104	Turkmenistan	62.2	▼2.3	▼4.3	▼6.0	▼6.9	▼9.2	▼10.4
105	Paraguay	61.5	▼2.2	▼3.9	▼4.9	▼3.7	▼5.5	▼8.3
106	Ghana	60.8	▼1.5	▼2.2	▼3.1	▼3.4	▼5.1	▼7.3
107	Maldives	60.3	▼2.6	▼4.2	▼7.3	▼5.9	▼9.5	▼12.1
108	Dominican Republic	60.2	▼0.6	▼2.6	▼4.5	▼4.2	▼6.0	▼9.0
109	Jamaica	59.3	▼2.6	▼2.8	▼1.9	▼0.7	▼1.9	▼3.8
109	Namibia	59.3	▼1.0	▼3.6	▼5.0	▼5.8	▼7.1	▼9.5
111	Guyana	59.2	▼2.4	▼5.0	▼6.9	▼6.8	▼9.0	▼11.2
112	Cuba	59.1	▼0.4	▼1.0	▼0.4	▼0.1	▼1.7	▼3.8
113	Suriname	58.8	▼0.9	▼2.0	▼2.7	▼1.3	▼3.1	▼5.2
114	North Macedonia	58.1	▼2.2	▼4.5	▼6.4	▼4.0	▼6.5	▼6.7
115	Kazakhstan	57.8	▼2.8	▼1.7	▼3.4	▼2.0	▼3.8	▼5.6
116	Cape Verde	57.2	▼2.9	▼4.2	▼7.0	▼7.6	▼9.4	▼10.8
117	Belize	57.0	▼2.8	▼5.1	▼7.2	▼3.8	▼5.5	▼6.7
118	Montenegro	56.9	▼1.1	▼1.0	▼1.6	▲1.4	▲1.6	▲1.6
119	Vietnam	56.2	▼2.1	▼4.7	▼7.1	▼7.7	▼9.9	▼12.2
120	Albania	55.9	▼0.9	▼0.8	▼3.1	▼2.9	▼3.0	▼4.2
121	Greece	54.7	▼0.4	▼1.1	▲0.2	▲2.6	▲0.8	▼0.6
122	Cyprus	54.1	▼2.9	▼2.8	▼3.3	▼2.0	▼3.7	▼6.2
123	Brunei	53.9	▼0.8	▼1.2	▼2.4	▼2.7	▼3.6	▼5.9
124	Botswana	53.6	▼1.7	▼2.5	▼3.4	▼3.5	▼5.9	▼8.4
125	Trinidad and Tobago	53.5	▲0.6	▲1.1	▲0.6	▲1.6	▲0.5	▼1.1
126	Malaysia	53.1	▼1.9	▼3.3	▼3.8	▼4.5	▼7.4	▼10.5
127	Antigua and Barbuda	51.9	▼1.9	▼2.3	▼3.0	▼0.2	▼2.5	▼3.7
127	Grenada	51.9	▼1.8	▼2.4	▼4.2	▼3.3	▼5.7	▼8.0
129	Israel	51.5	▲7.4	▲8.9	▲8.5	n/a	n/a	n/a
130	Romania	51.0	▼2.0	▲0.2	Steady	▲4.3	▲3.2	▲1.6
130	Seychelles	51.0	▼2.3	▼3.2	▼5.3	▼3.7	▼4.2	▼5.8
132	Mongolia	50.7	▼0.6	▼0.9	▼1.6	▼1.2	▼3.4	▼4.2
133	Bulgaria	49.4	▼2.4	▼2.2	▼2.2	▲0.2	▼1.2	▼2.3
134	Kuwait	49.3	▼1.9	▼2.9	▼3.6	▼1.6	▼3.9	▼6.6
135	Bahamas	48.0	▼1.2	▼2.6	▼4.4	▼1.9	▼0.8	▼2.0
136	Panama	47.7	▼1.0	▲0.2	▼1.0	▲1.7	▲0.7	▼1.8
137	Oman	47.4	▼1.3	▼2.1	▼3.0	▼0.6	▼2.6	▼5.2
138	Hungary	46.2	▼2.6	▼4.6	▼4.9	▼1.4	▼3.4	▼4.0
139	Croatia	45.9	▼2.8	▼3.4	▼3.9	▼0.2	▼1.6	▼2.8
140	Barbados	44.7	▼0.7	▼1.2	▼2.3	▼1.7	▼3.3	▼3.5
141	United States	44.5	▼0.8	▼2.1	▼0.1	▲6.2	▲6.5	▲6.8
142	Argentina	44.2	▼2.2	▼3.7	▼5.9	▼1.9	▼1.8	▼1.9
143	Spain	44.0	▲0.5	▼0.4	▼0.8	▲3.6	▲3.3	▲2.6
144	Poland	41.7	▼3.5	▼0.5	▼1.4	▲0.7	▼1.1	▲0.2
145	Latvia	41.4	▼1.9	▼1.4	▼2.6	▼0.9	▼2.5	▼3.5
146	Chile	41.1	▼1.1	▼2.1	▼3.0	▼1.4	▲2.2	▲0.4
146	Italy	41.1	▼1.5	▼2.3	▼4.1	▼1.3	▼2.7	▼2.7
148	United Kingdom	40.8	▼1.1	▲0.2	▼0.7	▲2.5	▲4.1	▲6.5
149	Qatar	39.8	▼0.7	▼2.5	▼4.3	▼3.9	▼5.6	▼8.3
150	Costa Rica	39.4	▼1.0	▼1.6	▼3.1	▼0.8	▼2.6	▼3.8
151	Mauritius	37.8	▼0.2	▼0.1	▼0.3	▲0.6	▼1.1	▼2.7
152	Czech Republic	37.7	▼2.5	▼2.2	▼1.6	▲2.0	▲0.1	▼1.3
153	Lithuania	37.4	▼2.0	▼1.2	▼1.3	▲0.9	▼0.7	▼2.0
154	Estonia	36.5	▼2.1	▼1.2	▼3.0	▼2.0	▼4.3	▼6.5
155	Slovakia	35.3	▼2.5	▼1.8	▼3.7	▼2.9	▼5.2	▼7.2
156	United Arab Emirates	34.7	▼2.3	▼4.4	▼5.6	▼3.4	▼5.4	▼8.1
157	Uruguay	33.7	▼0.7	▼1.5	▼2.2	▲0.3	▼0.3	▼1.7
158	Malta	31.1	▼1.9	▼3.6	▼5.1	▼2.5	▼3.4	▼5.1
159	Belgium	30.3	▼1.1	▼1.6	▼0.7	▲3.2	▲1.7	▲0.6
160	Japan	30.2	▼0.3	▼0.8	▼2.0	▼2.1	▼4.1	▼4.3
161	South Korea	29.8	▼1.7	▼2.9	▼2.7	▼2.2	▼3.9	▼5.9
162	France	28.3	▼0.5	▼2.6	▼4.2	▼2.2	▼3.7	▼3.9
163	Slovenia	26.1	▼1.2	▼1.6	▼2.1	▲0.3	▼1.9	▼4.2
164	Portugal	25.9	▲0.2	▼1.6	▼0.9	▲2.4	▲0.6	▼1.4
165	Singapore	25.4	▼0.1	▼0.4	▼1.2	▼0.9	▼2.7	▼5.0
166	Germany	24.0	▼0.6	▲0.4	▼0.8	▲0.8	▼0.7	▼1.8
167	Austria	23.1	▼1.3	▼2.3	▼3.0	▼1.0	▼1.9	▼3.1
168	Sweden	20.6	Steady	▼0.3	▼0.8	▲2.4	▲0.3	▼0.2
169	Australia	19.6	▼2.4	▼3.1	▼2.2	▼0.1	▼0.1	▼1.2
170	Netherlands	19.5	▼1.5	▼2.6	▼4.6	▼3.4	▼5.3	▼6.7
171	Luxembourg	18.7	▼0.8	▼1.3	▼2.4	▼0.1	▼1.7	▼2.1
172	Canada	18.6	▼0.3	▼1.5	▼3.1	▼0.1	▼1.4	▼2.9
172	Ireland	18.6	▼0.9	▼2.2	▼3.6	▼1.3	▼2.0	▼2.1
174	Switzerland	16.2	▼1.6	▼2.7	▼3.7	▼0.9	▼2.5	▼3.0
175	Denmark	15.9	▼2.0	▼2.2	▼2.9	▼1.3	▼3.6	▼3.9
175	New Zealand	15.9	▼0.8	▼1.6	▼2.5	▼2.0	▼4.2	▼5.0
177	Iceland	15.2	▼0.5	▼1.9	▼2.8	▼2.6	▼4.6	▼5.1
178	Finland	14.3	▼1.7	▼0.8	▼1.9	▼0.3	▼2.6	▼3.6
179	Norway	12.7	▼1.8	▼2.9	▼3.9	▼3.5	▼5.3	▼5.6
