= Elite pact =

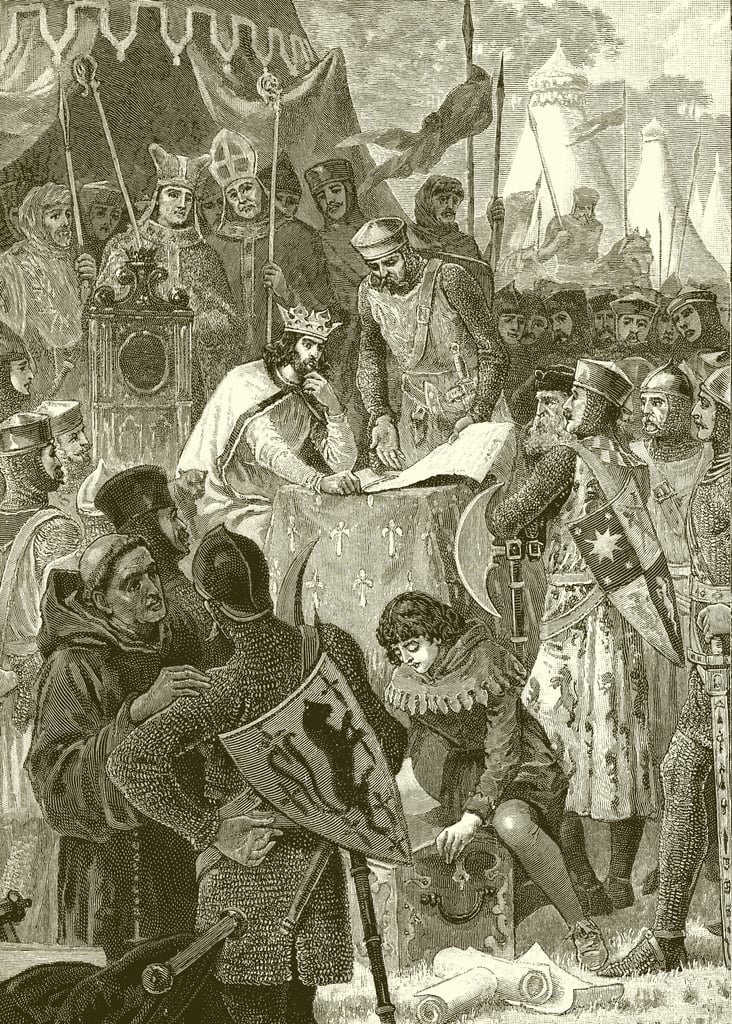
King John signing the Magna Carta — the charter of rights of the powerful barons which has been described as "the greatest constitutional document of all times — the foundation of the freedom of the individual against the arbitrary authority of the despot".

An elite pact or political settlement is an explicit agreement or agreed understanding between elites which moderates the violence and winner takes all nature of unrestrained conflict. The elites are often political elites, but in a research context of political economy, they can also be social and economic. Such settlements are often understood to transform government from an autocratic mode into more pluralistic, democratic form. Meanwhile, it is also a political economy framework to understand why sometimes an autocratic mode works whilst a democratic fails. Others may view the political settlement as normatively neutral.

This concept in political theory is part of elite theory and state-building. Joel Migdal has suggested that the concept of political settlements has a pedigree going back to the work of Barrington Moore. Political settlements are the frameworks for governing a state established by elites, either through formal processes or informally over time. There are numerous definitions of political settlements and elite pacts, often including an emphasis on understandings between elites that bring about the conditions to end conflict, or maintain peace. In 2011 the World Bank's World Development Report suggested a new terminology for political settlements with the concept of 'good enough coalitions.'

Elite pacts can be explicitly articulated (enshrined in an evolving document – such as a peace agreement or a constitution).

Verena Fritz and Alina Rocha Menocal published a paper in 2007 arguing that political settlements are a 'domain' at the heart of all state processes. They relate the concept to broader state theory (including the issues of elections and legitimacy). They stress that political settlements are not one-off events but evolve over time.

Important contributions on the establishing of political settlements in modern (particularly newly democratic) states have also been made by Thomas Carothers and Marina Ottaway of the Carnegie Endowment for International Peace. Also of note is JC Scott's work 'Seeing Like a State' which explores the routes through which political settlements in medieval Europe began to consolidate formal state structures.

== Political Settlements Framework ==
The Political Settlements Framework explains how growth happens or stalls when specific institutions are only partially enforced but still workable because they fit the distribution of organisational power. Mushtaq Khan’s core insight is to prioritise feasible, growth-enhancing institutions and the discipline of rents over generic ‘good governance’.

Specifically, a ‘political settlement’ can be an interpretive framework for explaining how economic transformation proceeds when rules are only partially enforced yet workable because they fit the existing distribution of organised power. The centre of analysis is enforceability, not the elegance of legal texts or generic ‘good governance’. The question asked is simple and demanding: given who can veto, reward and punish, which rules can actually be implemented at tolerable conflict and monitoring cost. Growth then appears as an outcome of fit between power and institutions rather than as the reward for adopting an ideal checklist. This is why the framework should not be mistaken for an elite-bargain manual. Private deals may occur, but the analytic focus is the structural match between organisations and enforceable rules, and the way that match sustains a politically and economically viable order capable of learning, disciplining behaviour, and reallocating resources toward higher productivity uses.

A political settlement is the match between a society’s distribution of holding power (organised capacity to reward, punish, or veto, please see Khan and Gray's work) and a set of actually enforceable rules. Growth is driven when, given that match, states implement growth-enhancing (not merely market-enhancing) institutions and use disciplined rents to finance learning and enforce performance. The operative logic is: settlement → enforceability → rent design and discipline → learning and capability accumulation → productivity and transformation (for productive capabilities, please see Ha-Joon Chang and Antonio Andreoni).

The core mechanism is disciplined rents. Policy creates above-normal returns—through tariffs, licences, targeted credit, land allocation, procurement, tax rebates—that can finance learning if and only if they are time-bound, measurable, and genuinely retractable for non-performance. When such ‘learning rents’ are tied to export, productivity, localisation, or reliability milestones, they convert protection into capability formation. In weak enforcement environments, these targeted, monitorable instruments often have higher marginal returns than broad ‘market-enhancing’ reforms. This logic underwrites the principle of the feasible second-best: start with growth-enhancing institutions that can actually be implemented under the prevailing balance of power; then, as organisational capabilities and oversight capacities rise, expand the frontier of what is enforceable. The aim is not to postpone legality or competition indefinitely, but to sequence them so that performance discipline and capability accumulation make stronger market institutions viable rather than merely aspirational.

In classical political economy, ‘rent’ named the income accruing to ownership of non-reproducible assets, above returns to labour and capital. Smith treated it as a deduction from produce enabled by the landlord’s command over scarce land; Ricardo formalised it as differential rent, arising because cultivation extends from the most to the least fertile plots, with rent determined by the price of corn rather than determining it; Marx extended the analysis to the class structure of capitalism, distinguishing differential and absolute rent rooted in landed property and market power. Developmental-states scholarship reframed rent from a passive surplus to an instrument for late industrialisation. Johnson showed how Japan’s MITI used administrative guidance, selective credit and protection; Amsden argued that ‘getting prices wrong’ and reciprocal control mechanisms tied subsidies to performance; Wade documented export targets and monitoring as discipline; Evans emphasised ‘embedded autonomy’ to curb capture while coordinating learning. The core move is not to wish rents away but to design and police them: time-bound, measurable, retractable, and linked to capability formation. Properly governed rents purchase learning and coordination under uncertainty, transforming temporary protection into productivity gains and, over time, expanding the frontier of what competitive markets can actually sustain.

The dynamic dimension asks who enforces and how. Enforcement capacity is disaggregated into concrete organisations and factions inside ruling coalitions, party–state hierarchies, development agencies, business associations, financial allocators, and platform-type lead firms. Informal networks and even 'grand corruption' are treated analytically as part of how a settlement is reproduced, sometimes stabilising coalitions by redistributing rents, often undermining discipline when withdrawal and sanction are not credible. External anchors—export targets, buyer pressure, international audits, performance contracts—can harden incentives and provide low-cost monitoring. Settlements evolve with crises, leadership turnover, fiscal or regulatory reforms, and sectoral cycles; these moments open temporary windows in which new rules become enforceable or old ones can finally be withdrawn. The framework therefore resists static labelling. It studies the historically sedimented sources of authority and the shifting costs of conflict, explaining why similar policy texts yield divergent implementation trajectories across places and over time.

In weak enforcement contexts, generic ‘good governance’ can be neither feasible nor binding for growth; targeted, monitorable support tied to export or productivity milestones often yields higher returns and can expand the future frontier of what is enforceable.

More recently Christine Bell of the Political Settlements Research Programme has argued that political settlements analysis is centrally concerned with how to understand and support elite pacts while enabling transformation to other forms of broader inclusion.

In political science the concept of `political settlements' is distinct from short-term processes aimed at elite agreements, such as a `peace process' or `peace agreement.' Peace negotiations and agreements may be part of the process of achieving a political settlement, but the settlement itself is the period of time for which an elite agreement holds, which could last for days or centuries.

Controversially the political scientist Patrick Chabal has suggested that the concept of political settlements is often less useful than that of `political sedimentation,' the residue of elite accommodation that is left after a period of contestation or explicit conflict, (quoted from Whaites above) see also.

The term political settlement is now use by key development agencies, despite confusion over what exactly the term means, and doubts over how the concept assists development actors intervene more effectively to support stable, open and inclusive political settlement.

== Bibliography ==
- Bell, Christine, What we talk about when we talk about Political Settlements, PSRP Working paper 1, 1 September 2015
- Fritz, V and Rocha Menocal A, Understanding state-building from a political economy perspective, ODI, London 2007
- Migdal Joel, State in Society, CUP, 2001
- Moore, B, `Social Origins of Dictatorship and Democracy,' Beacon Press 1993
- Scott, JC, `Seeing Like a State,' Yale University Press, 1999
- Whaites, A, States in Development, DFID, London 2008
- Xu, T. (2024a). The Road Not Taken? Industrial Policy and Political Settlements in China and Indonesia 1990–2022. https://doi.org/10.2139/ssrn.5085509
- Gray, H. (2013). Industrial Policy and the Political Settlement in Tanzania: Aspects of Continuity and Change since Independence. Review of African Political Economy, 40(136), 185–201. https://doi.org/10.1080/03056244.2013.794725
- Gray, H. (2015). The Political Economy of Grand Corruption in Tanzania. African Affairs, 114(456), 382–403. https://doi.org/10.1093/afraf/adv017
- Gray, H. (2018). Turbulence and Order in Economic Development: Economic Transformation in Tanzania and Vietnam. Oxford University Press. https://doi.org/10.1093/oso/9780198714644.001.0001.
- Hickey, S. & Lavers, T. (2015). Investigating the Political Economy of Social Protection Expansion in Africa: At the Intersection of Transnational Ideas and Domestic Politics. SSRN Working Paper 2598114 & ESID Working Paper 47. Effective States and Inclusive Development Research Centre at the University of Manchester. https://doi.org/10.2139/ssrn.2598114.
- Kelsall, T. (2018). Towards a Universal Political Settlement Concept: A Response to Mushtaq Khan. African Affairs, 117(469), 656–669. https://doi.org/10.1093/afraf/ady018
- Khan, M. (2013). Political Settlements and the Design of Technology Policy. In: J. Stiglitz, J. Lin & E. Patel (eds.), The Industrial Policy Revolution II, Palgrave Macmillan. https://doi.org/10.1057/9781137335234_10.
- Khan, M. (2018a). Political Settlements and the Analysis of Institutions. African Affairs, 117(469), 636–655. https://doi.org/10.1093/afraf/adx044.
- Khan, M. (2018b). Power, Pacts and Political Settlements: A Reply to Tim Kelsall. African Affairs, 117(469), 670–694. https://doi.org/10.1093/afraf/ady019
- Xu, T. (2024b). The Third Way: Reinterpreting the Political Settlements Framework with Structuration Theory. MPRA Working Paper 122491. https://mpra.ub.uni-muenchen.de/122491
