= Voluntary Principles on Security and Human Rights =

The Voluntary Principles on Security and Human Rights (VPs) is a collaborative effort by governments, major multinational extractive companies, and NGOs to provide guidance to companies on tangible steps that they can take to minimize the risk of human rights abuses in communities located near extraction sites. The principles documents provide guidance to companies in developing practices that maintain the safety and security of their operations while respecting the human rights of those who come into contact with security forces related to those operations. The Principles give guidance on risk assessment, public safety and security, human rights abuses, and the interaction between companies and private and public security.

The written principles represent a voluntary agreement between participating companies, governments and NGOs on what steps companies should take to ensure their security practices respect human rights. To distinguish between the principles and the multi-stakeholder initiative, the voluntary principles are frequently abbreviated to the VPs and the tripartite organization is abbreviated to the VPI (Voluntary Principles Initiative).

== The Principles ==
The introduction to the text of the VPs includes the following statement that captures the various interests that the principles attempt to address:

Acknowledging that security is a fundamental need, shared by individuals, communities, businesses, and governments alike, and acknowledging the difficult security issues faced by Companies operating globally, we recognize that security and respect for human rights can and should be consistent.

The VPs include provisions defining expectations that:

- companies should regularly engage with host governments and local communities regarding security issues and practices;
- security forces should act in a manner consistent with UN Principles on the Use of Force and Firearms by Law Enforcement Officials and the UN Code of Conduct for Law Enforcement Officials, including that any use of force needs to be proportional to the related threat;
- companies should have mechanisms for the reporting and investigation of allegations of improper actions by private security forces hired by the company;
- companies should have mechanism to report alleged abuses by public security forces in their area of operation, and to encourage and monitor progress of investigations;

Through the inclusion of elements of the VPs in services contracts with security providers, the VPs have been cited as a precedent for the inclusion of codes of conduct in legal contracts.

While the VPs are not designed to deal with root causes of conflicts, they do guide companies to have measures in place to prevent conflicts from escalating to violent confrontation. An April 2015 article in the newsletter of the International Council on Mining and Metals, International Alert, noted that while this potential seems to be recognized at senior levels in companies that have committed to the VPs, there is work still to be done to better implement the principles "on the ground". This reflects both the challenges of translating the principles into practices appropriate in each operating context, and also challenges companies can have in engaging with, and reaching agreements with, public authorities in operating locations.

The Principles are significant in two ways:

- the articulation of the principles provides important guidance to industry and also common reference points for dialogue between industry, government and civil society on how to align security and human rights; and
- the development of the Principles represented an important international collaboration between industry, government and civil society organizations

The Principles have also been cited as an example of moving the notion of corporate citizenship from principle into practice, though the commitment by participating companies to follow the approach articulated in the Principles.

== Voluntary Principles Initiative (organization) ==
The Voluntary Principles Initiative (VPI) was established in 2000, and although developed before the United Nations Guiding Principles on Business and Human Rights, the VPs are consistent with the responsibility of business to respect human rights as outlined in the UN Guiding Principles.

The Initiative is a multi-stakeholder initiative composed of governments, multinational oil, gas, and mining companies, and non-governmental organizations. The initiative is chaired by a member government, rotating between country members annually. As of 2019 participants in the initiative include 10 national governments, 29 companies, and 15 non-governmental organizations. Foley Hoag LLP served as the Secretariat from 2010-2018. Compass Consulting International Ltd. has served as the Secretariat since 2019.

The VPI holds an annual two-day plenary meeting to discuss progress and issues in the implementation of the VPs and to agree on collective priorities for the Initiative in the following year.

== Supporting activities and guidance ==
Supporting documentation produced by the VPI for the VPs includes definitions of role and responsibilities of participating companies, governments, and non-governmental organizations.

Member organizations have also collaborated to produce guidance documents to assist companies and civil society organizations in working with the VPs.

- In 2008 International Alert, with financial support from the U.K. and Canadian governments, developed a guide titled "Voluntary Principles on Security and Human Rights: Performance Indicators".
- In 2012 a guide to the implementation of the VPs was launched by the International Finance Corporation (IFC), the International Council on Mining and Metals (ICMM), the global oil and gas industry association for environmental and social issues (IPECA), and the International Red Cross
- In 2015 the Global Compact Network Canada launched a "Guidance Document on the Assurance of the Voluntary Principles (VPs) on Security and Human Rights" to assist companies in assessing their degree of implementation of the VPs.

Member countries also make efforts to encourage companies operating internationally to adhere to the VPs. The Canadian government includes the VPs in its framework "Doing Business the Canadian Way: A Strategy to Advance Corporate Social Responsibility in Canada’s Extractive Sector Abroad". The Swiss government describes its efforts as both raising awareness of the VPs among mining companies based in Switzerland, and also engaging with host governments in resource rich countries to persuade those governments to join the initiative and also to promote dialogue between host governments, companies and civil society - particularly in Peru and the Democratic Republic of the Congo.
