= Thomas Carothers =

American lawyer and international relations scholar

- Born: June 28, 1956 (age 70)
- Citizenship: American
- Education: Harvard University (BA, JD); London School of Economics (MSc)
- Occupations: Lawyer, international relations scholar
- Employer: Carnegie Endowment for International Peace

Thomas Carothers (born June 28, 1956) is an American lawyer and international relations scholar. His research focuses on international democracy support, democratization, and U.S. foreign policy. He is a senior fellow at the Carnegie Endowment for International Peace, where he founded and currently co-directs the Democracy, Conflict, and Governance Program. He has also taught at several universities in the U.S. and Europe, including Central European University, the Johns Hopkins School of Advanced International Studies, and Nuffield College, Oxford.

Carothers has served in various senior management positions at the Carnegie Endowment, including as the interim president of the Endowment in 2021, and as senior vice president for studies for many years.

== Early life and education ==
Carothers received a B.A., summa cum laude, from Harvard College; an M.Sc. from the London School of Economics as a Marshall Scholar; and a J.D. from Harvard Law School. He speaks English, French, and Spanish.

== Career ==
Prior to joining the Carnegie Endowment in 1993, Carothers worked at Arnold & Porter in Washington, DC. He was an attorney-adviser at the Office of the Legal Adviser of the U.S. Department of State from 1985 to 1988. While serving at the State Department, he worked with the United States Agency for International Development (USAID) on democracy assistance in Latin America. This experience formed the basis for his first book, In the Name of Democracy: U.S. Policy Toward Latin America in the Reagan Years.

His work has focused on international democracy support, including civil society development, political party assistance, rule of law assistance, and democratic transitions.

Carothers is the author of five books on international democracy and development assistance. He has also written numerous articles for the Journal of Democracy, Foreign Affairs, Foreign Policy, and other publications. His writings have been translated into many languages.

== Publications ==
=== Books ===
- Democracies Divided: The Global Challenge of Political Polarization (co-edited with Andrew O’Donohue), Brookings Press, 2019.
- Development Aid Confronts Politics: The Almost Revolution (with Diane de Gramont), Carnegie Endowment for International Peace, 2013.
- Confronting the Weakest Link: Aiding Political Parties in New Democracies, Carnegie Endowment for International Peace, 2006.
- Promoting the Rule of Law Abroad: In Search of Knowledge (editor), Carnegie Endowment for International Peace, 2006.
- Uncharted Journey: Promoting Democracy in the Middle East (co-edited with Marina Ottaway). Carnegie Endowment for International Peace, 2005.
- Critical Mission: Essays on Democracy Promotion, Carnegie Endowment for International Peace, 2004.
- Funding Virtue: Civil Society Aid and Democracy Promotion (co-edited with Marina Ottaway), Carnegie Endowment for International Peace, 2000.
- Aiding Democracy Abroad: The Learning Curve, Carnegie Endowment for International Peace, 1999.
- Assessing Democracy Assistance: The Case of Romania, Carnegie Endowment for International Peace, 1996.
- In the Name of Democracy: U.S. Policy Toward Latin America in the Reagan Years, University of California Press, 1993.

=== Selected essays ===
- The Democratic Price of Countering Authoritarianism, Just Security, January 22, 2024
- Democracy Aid at 25: Time to Choose, Journal of Democracy, vol. 26, no. 1, January 2015.
- Accountability, Transparency, Participation, and Inclusion: A New Development Consensus? (with Saskia Brechenmacher), Carnegie Paper, October 2014.
- Closing Space: Democracy and Human Rights Support Under Fire (with Saskia Brechenmacher), Carnegie Report, February 2014.
- Democracy Policy Under Obama: Revitalization or Retreat?, Carnegie Report, January 2012.
- Aiding Governance in Developing Countries: Progress Amid Uncertainties (with Diane de Gramont), Carnegie Paper, November 2011.
- Looking for Help: Will Rising Democracies Become International Democracy Supporters? (with Richard Youngs), Carnegie Paper, July 2011.
- Think Again: Arab Democracy, Foreign Policy, March 10, 2011.
- The Elusive Synthesis, Journal of Democracy, vol. 21, no 4, October 2010.
- Revitalizing Democracy Assistance: The Challenge of USAID, Carnegie Report, October 2009.
- Stepping Back From Democratic Pessimism, Carnegie Paper no. 99, February 2009.
- Democracy Assistance: Political vs. Developmental, Journal of Democracy, vol. 20, no 1, January 2009.
- The Sequencing Fallacy, Journal of Democracy, vol. 18, no 1, January 2007.
- The Backlash Against Democracy Promotion, Foreign Affairs, March/April 2006.
- The End of the Transition Paradigm, Journal of Democracy, vol. 13, no 1, January 2002.
