= Fund for Peace =

American non-governmental organization

The Fund for Peace
- Abbreviation: FFP
- Formation: 1957
- Type: Research center, think tank
- Headquarters: 609 G St SW
- Location: Washington, D.C., United States
- President and Executive Director: Paul Turner
- Website: fundforpeace.org fragilestatesindex.org

The Fund for Peace is an American non-profit, non-governmental research and educational institution. Founded in 1957, FFP "works to prevent violent conflict and promote sustainable security."

The Fund for Peace works towards sustainable security and development in failed states by focusing on conflict assessment and early warning, transnational threats, peacekeeping, and security and human rights. The Fund for Peace maintains programs in Nigeria, Uganda, Liberia, and works with private business in conflict zones to better secure the interests of businesses, local populations, and their governments.

== History ==
The Fund for Peace was founded in 1957 by Randolph Compton. The organization was created in the memory of Randolph Compton's youngest son, John Parker Compton, who was killed in World War II. At a young age, John Parker wrote an essay, discussing the effects of war and the need for human civilization to embrace other methods of conflict resolution. After John Parker's death, Compton created the Fund for Peace, an organization based on the ideals of justice, environment, peace, and population.

== Significant programs ==
=== The Fragile States Index ===
The Fragile States Index assesses the pressures experienced by nations based on social, economic, and political indicators such as demographic pressures, refugee flows, uneven economic development or severe economic decline, and human rights, among others.

The "Failed States Index" debuted in 2005 with a limited assessment of approximately 75 countries; this was expanded to 146 countries in 2006, and then to 177 countries the following year. South Sudan was added to the assessment in 2011. In 2014, The Fund for Peace announced that the ranking would be renamed "Fragile States Index", claiming that the controversial term 'failed' had "[become] a distraction away from the point of the Index, which is to encourage discussions that support an increase in human security and improved livelihoods."

The Fragile States Index uses color-coded maps, tables, and a four level-ranking system ("Alert," "Warning," "Moderate," "Sustainable") to determine the current conditions and negative potential in the future. All four nations on high "Alert" are a part of the African continent: Somalia, Sudan, South Sudan, the Democratic Republic of the Congo. At the "Warning" level were many Latin American or former Soviet nations, including Moldova, Russia, Belarus, Colombia, Bolivia, and Mexico. At "Moderate" were the United States and several European states, such as Latvia, Poland, Italy, and Spain. Only a few nations, such as the Scandinavian countries, Iceland, Ireland, Canada, Australia and New Zealand were rated as "Sustainable."

The Fragile States Index is subject to criticism, in part, because it takes institutions and data to draw its conclusions, as opposed to the Human Development Index or other more telling signs. The FSI is checked against human analysis.

==== Governments' reactions to the FSI ====
- Dr. Mohamed ElBaradei called Egypt's low-rank on the FSI "a disaster"
- U.S. Secretary of State Hillary Clinton cites FSI research in State Department report to congress
- U.S. Secretary of Defense Robert Gates uses FSI research in the 2010 Quadrennial Defense Review

=== UNLocK ===
UNLocK links global information technologies with local social networks for the benefits of stakeholders. FFP conducts workshops in the conflict-affected countries of Liberia, Uganda, and Nigeria, training local participants in the Conflict Assessment System Tool (CAST). They train others at the community level. Data collected from field reports by the participants are analyzed for signs of early-warning conflict. The aggregate data is privately disseminated back to the participants and used to resolve disputes, identify priority issues at the community level, and as a way to obtain more immediate early warning and conflict prevention information.

While the recent elections in Nigeria were widely recognized as a major step forward in the difficult journey toward democracy, UNLocK Nigeria provided a ground-level view of challenges that remained, including incidents of ballot box snatching, vote-buying, abductions, and violence. This report focuses on the Niger Delta Region, with a particular emphasis on the Akwa Ibom and Rivers states.

=== Threat convergence ===
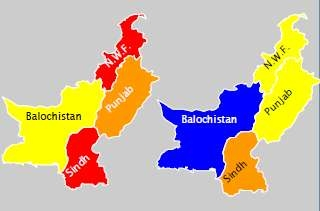
Demographic pressures differentiated regionally throughout Pakistan, pre-flood (left) and post-flood (right).

The Center for the Study of Threat Convergence explores the linkages between fragile states, the proliferation of weapons of mass destruction, and terrorism.

- The center aims to:
  - raise the profile of the challenges in vulnerable, fragile and ungoverned regions on the nonproliferation agenda;
  - explore how these regions may serve as enabling environments for nuclear terrorism;
  - promote more coherent and strategic policy approaches to nuclear terrorism and illicit nuclear trafficking.
- Recently Published Reports:
  - North Korean WMD Trading Relationships
  - Proliferation of Conventional Weapons
  - Threat Convergence in Pakistan

CSTC performs ground research in the Black Sea/South Caucasus region, the Tri-border area of Latin American, East and the Horn of Africa, and Southeast Asia. It partners with regional and sub regional organizations like NATO, the EU, and the African Union.

The Center for the Study of Threat Convergence is funded by the MacArthur Foundation, the Ford Foundation, and the Ploughshares Fund.

=== Business and FFP ===
Created in 1997, the Human Rights and Business Roundtable brings together businesses and human rights organizations to ensure compliance with international standards, particularly in regard to the conduct of security forces in and around industrial operations. It recognizes the challenges faced, particularly in the extractive industries, in balancing human rights and security. FFP works with various private companies in the oil, mining, agribusiness, renewable energy, and infrastructure sectors in both stable and conflict zones around the world. The Sustainable Development & Security program supports companies in their development of human rights and security policies, conflict and human rights assessments, community relations and stakeholder engagement, and monitoring and reporting mechanisms. FFP is a long-standing civil society participant of the Voluntary Principles on Security & Human Rights initiative, and currently serves on the initiative's Steering Committee and Board of Directors.

=== CAST ===
For conflict assessment, the Fund for Peace utilizes the Conflict Assessment System Tool (CAST). CAST was created in 1996 as a system of locating and analyzing potential conflicts in failed states. It works by incorporating "theoretical rationale, a conceptual framework, quantitative and qualitative indicators...and a rating system for trend analysis. " However, CAST may be criticized for putting too much emphasis on technology and equations, and not enough on the human analysis. Furthermore, CAST is a tool that remains static, despite the specific conflict at hand. Each case is unique, and CAST does not have the mathematical ability to assess the uniqueness and specific needs of varying failed states.

FFP maintains relationships with the United States Marine Corps and the South Korean government, among others.

== Past programs ==
=== Genocide prevention ===
As the Fund for Peace works in regions prone to genocide, the organization developed a relationship with the Office of the Special Adviser on the Prevention of Genocide. The Special Adviser played a role in researching and delivering information to aid the Special Adviser in his responsibilities. The Special Adviser and the Fund for Peace were involved in researching human rights violations, sharing information and giving warnings to the Secretary General and the Security Council on matters of genocide, and making recommendations on courses of action.

=== Peace and Stability Operations Project ===
Originally called the Regional Responses to Internal War Project, the program looks to shed light on regional organizations and their "political will" to maintain peaceful relations. The Peace and Stability Operations Project also serves to form relationships with actors in other sectors, such as scholars, research institutions, journalists, and experts. The Fund for Peace believes that, through these extended relationships, the international community can work together to maintain peace in typically violent areas. The Fund for Peace has been successful in advancing the international dialogue on peacekeeping by holding public meetings with international representatives, performing research missions in over thirty-five countries, and holding workshops. By collaborating with actors in other sectors, the Fund for Peace is able to gather the ideas and opinions of other experts and publish them in their issues of Reality Check: Diverse Voices on Internal Conflict.

=== United States foreign policy ===
The second initiative is the Use and Purpose of American Power. The goal of this initiative is to promote ongoing dialogue and debate on the role of the United States in the international arena. It does so by asking four questions:

- What are our interests and values as we act in the world?
- What are the specific goals we should set and the things we should do?
- What tools do we use to achieve these?
- How as Americans do we influence events as they so obviously affect us?

The Use and Purpose of American Power also has three main components. The first is the National Dialogue forums. In 2008 and 2009, the Fund for Peace partnered up with local organizations, such as chambers of commerce and universities, across the country and organized "'traveling town halls.'" The purpose of these were to discuss topics relating to the presidential election, and the condition of the United States and its population. The format of the forums were designed to encourage participation and dialogue on behalf of Americans to actively and critically think about their role, their country's condition, and the government's responsibility. Throughout two years, the National Dialogue forums took place in Pennsylvania, Ohio, New Mexico, Alabama, Idaho, Florida, and California.

The second component is the American Conversation. While the National Dialogue forums were designed to spark interest and discussion, the purpose of the American Conversation is an online discussion hosted by Google Groups to continue conversations that began at the National Dialogue forums. The American Conversation is an effort by the Fund for Peace to encourage ongoing critical thinking in the minds of Americans and their communities.

The third component of the Use and Purpose of American Power is the Final Report. The Final Report is a summary of the National Dialogue forums and the ideas and concepts presented at the forums. The Final Report, titled The Use and Purpose of American Power in the 21st Century highlights five main points:

- "Economic security is vital to American national security; but America’s structural economic problems prevent it from operating from a position of strength in the world."
- "National leaders should first ‘take care of their own’ because of the gravity of the economic challenges; however, America's welfare is also closely tied to the world economy."
- "Nation-building and democracy-building projects are a mission impossible; still, the U.S. should promote good governance, human rights, and equitable development."
- "Terrorism and the proliferation of weapons of mass destruction (WMD) are lesser threats than America’s economic problems."
- "U.S. leaders’ inability to adapt to new global realities poses the greatest challenge to America's standing in the world."

The Fund for Peace's efforts in United States foreign policy is based on the fear of "spillover" and the influence and multiplication of failed states. The National Dialogue forums were sponsored by the Fund for Peace. The Final Report was funded by the Ford Foundation.

=== Human rights ===
Another initiative to promote human rights is the Globalization and Human Rights Series. This consists of publications dedicated to discussing pertinent topics relating to human rights, the impact of failing states, and corruption. Four issues have been published since 2005 in an effort to continue to educate the industries and the public on the harmful effects of failing governments, and the need for the recognition of, and commitment to, human rights. Furthermore, the Fund for Peace is a supporter of the Voluntary Principles on Security and Human Rights, which guides businesses who voluntarily participate on how to align their security practices with human rights considerations. The Voluntary Principles are important because of the potentially harmful impacts security practices can have when operating in a failed state or conflict zone, but also because the international community is putting increasing emphasis on the rights of individuals.

== Other collaboration ==
The Fund for Peace does not limit its partnerships to select sectors. The organization has collaborated with Georgetown University's Center for Peace and Security Studies and the Stockholm International Peace Research Institute. Together, the three institutions developed a thesis on the increased participation of regional organizations and their member states in promoting peacekeeping.

The Fund for Peace partnered with the Centre for International Governance Innovation in 2007. From September 4–6, thirty participants from varying Middle Eastern countries, as well as Australia, the United States, and Canada, met in Istanbul, Turkey. The participants came from academia, international organizations, the Arab League, the United Nations, governments, and human rights organizations. The representatives were faced with the task of determining what steps should be taken to efficiently protect civilians. The conference promoted a sense of international unity by asking the representatives to leave aside their political ideologies and keep the welfare of human beings as their priority. The conference ended with the unanimous support of International Humanitarian Law and the Bosphorous Consensus.

The Fund for Peace has also partnered with Logos Technologies, the United States Institute of Peace, the United States Peacekeeping and Stability Operations Institute, the U.S. State Department Office of the Coordinator for Stabilization and Reconstruction, and the United States Army Corps of Engineers to create a metrics framework for peacekeeping. The project includes concepts from the book The Quest for Viable Peace with the theoretical approach of the Fund for Peace's CAST methodology. The organizations involved are interested in helping governments determine the outcome of Stabilization and Reconstruction Operations.
