= James Putzel =

James Putzel is a Professor of Development Studies and former Director of the Crisis States Research Centre at the LSE. He was educated at McGill and Oxford universities. His research focus has been on agrarian reform, social capital, political economy of development and crisis and fragile states.

He is best known for his book: A Captive Land: the Politics of Agrarian Reform in the Philippines.

== Crisis States Research Centre ==
The Crisis States Research Centre or 'Crisis States' was based within the LSE Development Studies Institute (DESTIN, now the Department of International Development) and led by Putzel. It was a broad research initiative funded by a grant from the UK Department for International Development (DFID) from 2000-2010. Its research concerned the origins and management of political conflict in the Global South. The Centre produced a number of articles, chapters, policy briefings, and other communications dealing with the origins, political economy, and mitigation of conflictual governance and violence. Particular emphasis was placed on events in Nicaragua, Uganda, Venezuela, the DRC, Colombia and the Philippines.

The Centre ran through two phases, the first from 2000-2005, led by Prof. James Putzel. There was collaboration around the world and, at LSE, some of the core participants were Teddy Brett, Tim Allen, David Keen, Jonathan DiJohn, Dennis Rodgers and Jean-Paul Faguet. Funding was not renewed after the second phase.

The most cited output from the project is a summary report from 2012.

== Main Publications ==
- Putzel, James & Morales Jr, Horacio, eds. (2002) Power in the Village: Agrarian Reform, Rural Politics, Institutional Change and Globalisation. University of Philippines Press.
- Putzel, James (1992) A Captive Land: the Politics of Agrarian Reform in the Philippines, London: Catholic Institute for International Relations. New York: Monthly Review Press
- Putzel, James & John Cunnington. (1989). Gaining ground: Agrarian reform in the Philippines. W.O.W. Campaigns.

== See also ==
- Fragile state
- Failed state
