= Fragile States Index =

Annual report for politically vulnerable countries

Countries according to the 2023 Fragile States Index Very high alert High alert Alert High warning Elevated warning Warning Stable More stable Very stable Sustainable Very sustainable Data unavailable

The Fragile States Index (FSI; formerly the Failed States Index) is an annual report mainly published and supported by the American think tank Fund for Peace. The FSI is also published by the American magazine Foreign Policy from 2005 to 2018, then by The New Humanitarian since 2019. The list aims to assess states' vulnerability to conflict or collapse, ranking all sovereign states with membership in the United Nations where there is enough data available for analysis. Taiwan, Northern Cyprus, Kosovo and Western Sahara are not ranked, despite being recognized as sovereign by one or more other nations. Palestine was ranked together with Israel until 2021. Ranking is based on the sum of scores for 12 indicators (see below). Each indicator is scored on a scale of 0 to 10, with 0 being the lowest intensity (most stable) and 10 being the highest intensity (least stable), creating a scale spanning 0−120.

== Indicators ==
Twelve conflict risk indicators are used to measure the condition of a state at any given moment. The indicators provide a snapshot in time that can be measured against other snapshots in a time series to determine whether conditions are improving or worsening. Below is the list of indicators used both in the CAST framework and also in the Fragile States Index.

- Demographic Pressures
- Economic Decline and Poverty
- External Intervention
- Factionalized Elites
- Group Grievance
- Human Flight and Brain Drain
- Human Rights and Rule of Law
- Public Services
- Refugees and Internally Displaced Persons
- Security Apparatus
- State Legitimacy
- Uneven Economic Development

== Methodology ==
The index's ranks are based on 15 indicators of state vulnerability, grouped by category: Cohesion, Economic, Political, and Social. The ranking is a critical tool in highlighting not only the normal pressures that all states experience, but also in identifying when those pressures are outweighing a state's capacity to manage those pressures. By highlighting pertinent vulnerabilities which contribute to the risk of state fragility, the Index — and the social science framework and data analysis tools upon which it is built — makes political risk assessment and early warning of conflict accessible to policy-makers and the public at large.

Scores are obtained via a process involving content analysis, quantitative data, and qualitative review. In the content analysis phase, millions of documents from over 100,000 English-language or translated sources (social media are excluded) are scanned and filtered through the Fund for Peace's Conflict Assessment Systems Tool (CAST), which utilizes specific filters and search parameters to sort data based on Boolean phrases linked to indicators, and assigns scores based on algorithms. Following CAST analysis, quantitative data from sources such as the United Nations (UN), World Health Organization (WHO), World Factbook, Transparency International, World Bank, and Freedom House are incorporated, which then leads to the final phase of qualitative reviews of each indicator for each country.

Considered together in the index, the indicators are a way of assessing a state's vulnerability to collapse or conflict, ranking states on a spectrum of categories labeled sustainable, stable, warning, and alert. Within each bracket, scores are also subdivided by severity. The score breakdown is as follows:

Category	FSI score*	Brackets (2016)	2015–2016 color	2005–2014 color
Alert	90.0–120.0	Very high: 110+ High: 100–109.9 Alert: 90–99.9	Red	Red
Warning	60.0–89.9	High: 80–89.9 Warning: 70–79.9 Low: 60–69.9	Yellow-Orange	Orange
Stable	30.0–59.9	Stable: 50–59.9 More stable: 40–49.9 Very stable: 30–39.9	Green	Yellow
Sustainable	0.0–29.9	Sustainable: 20–29.9 Very sustainable: 0–19.9	Blue	Green
Not assessed	N/A	—	Light gray	Light gray

All countries in the top three categories display features that make their societies and institutions vulnerable to failure. However, the FSI is not intended as a tool to predict when states may experience violence or collapse, as it does not measure direction or pace of change. It is possible for a state sorted into the 'stable' zone to be deteriorating at a faster rate than those in the more fragile 'warning' or 'alert' zones, and could experience violence sooner. Conversely, states in the red zone, though fragile, may exhibit positive signs of recovery or be deteriorating slowly, giving them time to adopt mitigating strategies.

== Criticism ==
=== Nomenclature ===
Years of controversy over the "failed state" terminology in the index's name contributed to change in 2014, with a shift from the Failed States Index to the Fragile States Index. Critics had argued that the term established a false binary division, or false dichotomy, between states that were salvageable and those that were beyond recovery. Krista Hendry, FFP's executive director, explained the change in part as a reaction to the debate the term failed state had generated, noting that "the name was negatively impacting our ability to get the right kind of attention for the FSI".

=== Purpose ===
Several academics and journalists have also criticized the FSI for a lack of utility and its measurement criteria. Authors writing for The National Interest and The Washington Post have argued that the FSI sends a message that the solution to problems in the developing world is "more state-building", when in fact state-building could be viewed as a cause of instability or fragility. Claire Leigh, writing for The Guardian in 2012, condemned the index as a "useless policy tool" which focused only on the symptoms of struggling states, ignoring causes or potential cures.

=== Methodology ===
Critics have also identified flaws with the FSI's measurement criteria, as well as the lack of transparency surrounding its base data analysis. For example, indicators related to refugees and human flight have allowed North Korea's score to improve as human emigration has declined; while this may indicate a stronger security apparatus in the state, it should not necessarily be recognized as an improvement. Additionally, analysis of the indicators has led several commentators to conclude that a combination of too many categories and a failure to distinguish between "government" and "state" (sometimes allowing political moves, such as Iran agreeing to negotiations with the West, to positively impact a score) complicates efforts to utilize findings. Several have argued for greater transparency in scoring methods, a reworking of the criteria to give the index predictive value, and a consolidation of indicators into umbrella groups for easier comparison.

Furthermore, criticism related to the way the ranking is put together since it was first published seventeen years ago in Foreign Policy magazine, seems to be disappearing as the ranking is focused on trends and rate-of-change. In addition, it is worth mentioning that the ranking focuses on measuring a country's performance over time against itself rather than against other countries' performance. The attention is then paid to a country's individual indicator scores instead of only its total composite score.

== Related indices ==
The Organization for Economic Cooperation and Development (OECD) has based its annual Fragile States Report, now named 'States of Fragility', on the FSI, as well as on data from the World Bank (which publishes its own lists of fragile states), since 2005.

On a monthly basis, International Crisis Group (ICG), a transnational non-governmental organization (NGO), publishes CrisisWatch, a bulletin designed to inform readers about the development of state-based conflict across the globe. The reports indicate whether or not situations have improved, deteriorated, or remained unchanged from the previous month, and seek to highlight where there may be risks of new/escalated (or opportunities for resolution of) conflicts in the coming month.

== See also ==
- List of countries by Fragile States Index
- Failed state
- Rogue state
- Ochlocracy
- Crisis States Research Centre
- Violent non-state actor
- Pariah state
- Banana republic
- International isolation
