= Failed state =

State that has lost its ability to govern

A failed state is a state that has lost its ability to fulfill fundamental security and development functions, lacking effective control over its territory and borders. Common characteristics of a failed state include a government incapable of tax collection, law enforcement, security assurance, territorial control, political or civil office staffing, and infrastructure maintenance. When this happens, likely consequences include widespread corruption and criminality, the intervention of state and non-state actors, the appearance of refugees and the involuntary movement of populations, sharp economic decline, and military intervention from both within and outside the state.

The term was initially applied in the 1990s to characterise the civil war in Somalia. The country descended into widespread disorder following a coup that ousted its dictator Siad Barre in 1991, leading to internal conflicts among the country's clans. The 2024 Fragile States Index ranked the nations of Somalia, Sudan, South Sudan, Syria, the Democratic Republic of the Congo, Yemen, Afghanistan, the Central African Republic, Haiti, Chad, Myanmar, Ethiopia, Mali, Nigeria, Libya, Guinea, Zimbabwe, Niger, and Cameroon among its 20 most fragile countries. All of these states, among others, score poorly on the Fragile States Index twelve conflict risk indicators, which are used to measure the condition of a state at any given moment. The indicators provide a snapshot in time that can be measured against other snapshots in a time series to determine whether conditions are improving or worsening. The Index uses its C.E.P.S framework, ranking countries on Cohesion, Economic, Political and Social factors.

Various metrics have been developed to describe the level of governance of states, with significant variation among authorities regarding the specific level of government control needed to consider a state as failed. The formal designation of a state as "failed" can be a controversial decision with significant geopolitical implications. Critics have argued that the term established a false binary division, or false dichotomy, between states that were salvageable and those that were beyond recovery.

== Definition and issues ==
The term "failed state" originated in the 1990s, particularly in the context of Somalia's turmoil after the overthrow of its dictator Siad Barre in 1991. The phrase gained prominence during the American-led intervention in Somalia in 1992. It was used to express concerns about the potential collapse of poor states into chaotic anarchy after the end of the Cold War, as highlighted by Robert Kaplan's depiction of chaos in Liberia and Sierra Leone and his warning of a "coming anarchy" in various global regions.

According to the political theories of Max Weber, a state is defined as maintaining a monopoly on the legitimate use of physical force within its borders. When this is broken (e.g., through the dominant presence of warlords, paramilitary groups, corrupt policing, armed gangs, or terrorism), the very existence of the state becomes dubious, and the state becomes a failed state. The difficulty of determining whether a government maintains "a monopoly on the legitimate use of force", which includes the problems of the definition of "legitimate", means it is not clear when a state can be said to have "failed". The problem of legitimacy can be solved by understanding what Weber intended by it. Weber explains that only the state has the means of production necessary for physical violence. This means that the state does not require legitimacy for achieving a monopoly on having the means of violence (de facto), but will need one if it needs to use it (de jure).

Typically, the term means that the state has been rendered ineffective and is not able to enforce its laws uniformly or provide basic goods and services to its citizens. The conclusion that a state is failing or has failed can be drawn from the observation of a variety of characteristics and combinations thereof. Examples of such characteristics include, but are not limited to, the presence of an insurgency, extreme political corruption, overwhelming crime rates suggestive of an incapacitated police force, an impenetrable and ineffective bureaucracy, judicial ineffectiveness, military interference in politics, and consolidation of power by regional actors such that it rivals or eliminates the influence of national authorities. Other factors of perception may be involved. A derived concept of "failed cities" has also been launched, based on the notion that while a state may function in general, polities at the substate level may collapse in terms of infrastructure, economy, and social policy. Certain areas or cities may even fall outside state control, becoming a de facto ungoverned part of the state.

No consistent or quantitative definition of a "failed state" exists; the subjective nature of the indicators that are used to infer state failure have led to an ambiguous understanding of the term. Some scholars focus on the capacity and effectiveness of the government to determine whether a state is failed. Other indices such as the Fund for Peace's Fragile States Index employ assessments of the democratic character of a state's institutions as a means of determining its degree of failure. Other scholars focus their argument on the legitimacy of the state, the nature of the state, the growth of criminal violence, the economic extractive institutions, or the states' capacity to control its territory. Robert H. Bates refers to state failure as the "implosion of the state", where the state transforms "into an instrument of predation" and effectively loses its monopoly on the means of force.

== Measurement ==
The measurement methods of state failure are generally divided into the quantitative and qualitative approach.

=== Quantitative approach ===
Quantitative measurement of state failure often focuses on the developmental level of the state (e.g. the Freedom House Index (FHI), the Human Development Index (HDI), or the World Bank Governance Indicators). Additionally, regional evaluation might give concrete details about the level of democracy such as the Report of Democratic Development in Latin America (Informe de desarrollo democrático de América Latina).

==== Fragile States Index ====
Countries according to the 2023 Fragile States Index Very high alert (111–120) High alert (101–110) Alert (91–100) High warning (81–90) Elevated warning (71–80) Warning (61–70) Less stable (51–60) Stable (41–50) More stable (31–40) Sustainable (21–30) Very sustainable (0–20) Data unavailable

The Fragile States Index (FSI), first published in 2005, measures failed state qualities. Edited by the magazine Foreign Policy, the ranking examines 178 countries based on analytical research of the Conflict Assessment System Tool (CAST) of the Fund for Peace. In the 2015 report, written by the Fund for Peace, there are three groupings: social, economic, and political with 12 overall indicators.

Social indicators:

- Demographic pressures
- Refugees or internally displaced persons
- Group grievance
- Human flight and brain drain

Economic indicators:

- Uneven economic development
- Poverty and economic decline

Political and military indicators:

- State legitimacy
- Public services
- Human rights and rule of law
- Security apparatus
- Factionalized elites
- External intervention

In the 2015 index, South Sudan ranked number one, Somalia number two, and the Central African Republic number three. Finland was the most stable and sustainable country in the list.

While the FSI is used in many pieces of research and makes the categorization of states more pragmatic, it often receives much criticism for several reasons:

1. It does not include the Human Development Index to reach the final score but instead focuses on institutions to measure what are often also considered human aspects for development.
2. It parallels the fragility or vulnerability of states with underdevelopment. This comparison firstly assumes that underdevelopment (economic) creates vulnerability, thus assuming that if a state is "developed" it is stable or sustainable.
3. It measures the failure (or success) of a state without including the progress of other areas outside the sphere of the 12 indicators, thus excluding important measures of development such as the decline in child mortality rates, and increased access to clean water sources and medication, amongst others.

FSI is used by governments, organizations, educators and analysts, sometimes to highlight the issues that cause threats.

=== Qualitative approach ===
The qualitative approach embraces theoretical frameworks. Normally, this type of measurement applies stage models to allow the categorization of states. In three to five stages, researchers show state failure as a process. Notable researchers, among others, are Robert I. Rotberg in the Anglo-American and Ulrich Schneckener in the German sphere.

Schneckener's 2006 stage model defines three core elements, monopoly of violence, legitimacy, and rule of law. The typology is based on the security first logic and thus, shows the relevance of the monopoly of violence in comparison to the other two while at the same time acting as the precondition for a functioning state. His four statehood types are: (1) consolidated and consolidating states, (2) weak states, (3) failing, and (4) collapsed/failed states. The first type is directed towards functioning states; all core functions of the state are functioning in the long term. In weak states, the monopoly of force is still intact, but the other two areas show serious deficits. Failing states lack the monopoly of force, while the other areas function at least partially. Finally, collapsed or failed states are dominated by parastatal structures characterized by actors trying to create a certain internal order, but the state cannot sufficiently serve the three core elements.

Both research approaches show some irregularities. While the quantitative approach lacks transparency concerning its indicators and their balancing in the evaluation process of countries, the qualitative approach shows a diversity of different foci. One of the major discrepancies is the question of whether all the stages have to be taken continuously or if a state can skip one phase. Schneckener stresses that his model should actually not be interpreted as a stage model as, in his opinion, states do not necessarily undergo every stage. Rotberg's model underlies an ordinal logic and thus, implies that the state failure process is a chronological chain of phases.

== Theoretical mechanisms for state development ==
=== State development through war-making ===
Charles Tilly (1985) argues that war-making was an indispensable aspect of state development in Europe through the following interdependent functions:

- War-making—rulers eliminate external rivals (requires building military forces and supportive bureaucracies)
- State-making—rulers eliminate internal rivals and establish control over their territories (requires building police forces and bureaucracies)
- Protection—rulers bring about benefit to their clients by eliminating their external rivals and guaranteeing their rights (requires building courts and representative assemblies)
- Extraction—rulers extract more tax from their subjects (requires building tax collection apparatuses and exchequers)

Tilly summarizes this linkage in the famous phrase: "War made the state, and the state made war."

Similarly, Herbst (1990) adds that a war might be the only chance to strengthen an extraction capability since it forced rulers to risk their political lives for extra revenue and forced subjects to consent to pay more tax. It is also important for state development because the increased revenue would not return to its original level even after the wars end. Contrary to European states, however, he also pointed out that most Third World states lacked external threats and had not waged interstate wars, implying that these states are unlikely to take similar steps in the future.

Maps of some current active wars

Myanmar civil war

Sudanese civil war

Somali Civil War

=== "Nation-building" by developed countries ===
Steward and Knaus (2012) tackle the question "Can intervention work?" and conclude "we can help nations build themselves" by putting an end to war and providing "well-resourced humanitarian interventions". They criticize the overconfidence of policymakers on nation-building by contrasting what they regard as successful interventions in Bosnia (1995) and Kosovo (1999) with the failed attempt of nation-building in Iraq (2003) and Afghanistan (2001–2021) in which the U.S. lost thousands of lives over ten years and expended more than a trillion dollars without realizing its central objective of nation-building. When a so-called failed nation-state is crushed by internal violence or disruption, and consequently is no longer able to deliver positive political goods to its inhabitants, developed states feel the obligation to intervene and assist in rebuilding them. However, intervention is not always seen positively, but due to past intervention by for instance the U.S. government, scholars argue that the concept of a failed state is an invented rationale to impose developed states' interests on less powerful states.

Labeling states like Somalia or Liberia as failed states gives Western countries the legitimization to impose the Western idea of a stable nation-state. It is commonly accepted that nation-building or international response to troubled/rogue states happens too late or too quickly, which is due to inadequate analysis or a lack of political will. Still, it is important to highlight that developed nations and their aid institutions have had a positive impact on many failed states. Nation-building is context-specific; thus, a country's cultural-political and social environment needs to be carefully analyzed before intervening as a foreign state. The Western world has increasingly become concerned about failed states and sees them as threats to security. The concept of the failed state is often used to defend policy interventions by the West. Further, as Chesterman, Ignatieff, and Thakur argue, regarding the duration of international action by developed states and international organizations, a central problem is that a crisis tends to be focused on time, while the most essential work of reframing and building up a state and its institutions takes years or decades. Therefore, effective state-building is a slow process, and suggesting otherwise to the domestic public is disingenuous.

=== Promoting development through foreign aid ===
Pritchett, Woolcock, and Andrews (2013) analyze the systematic failure of the development of failed states. They define "state administrative capability for implementation" as the key aspect of state development, and find the mechanism in which failed states stumbled regardless of decades of development practices tried, billions of dollars spent, and alleged "progress" boasted. These countries adopted the following techniques, which led to undermining it:

1. systemic isomorphic mimicry—disguising the dysfunction of states by simply mimicking the appearance of functional states.
2. premature load bearing—limited-capacity states being overloaded with "unrealistic expectations".

In light of the fact that many of these countries would likely need centuries to reach the state capability of developed countries, they suggest creating "context-specific institutions", promoting "incremental reform process", and setting "realistic expectations" for attaining the goal of substantial development.

Foreign aid produces several unintended consequences when used to develop the institutional capacity of the state. Donors will often delegate aid spending to recipient governments since they do not have the information or capacity to identify who is in the greatest need and how it can be best spent. The downside of this is that it can be captured by recipient governments and diverted either towards self-enrichment of incumbent elites or to establish and maintain clientelist networks to allow them to remain in power—for example, in Kenya, aid allocation is biased towards constituencies with high vote shares for the incumbent, so the geographic distribution of aid changes to their supporters following a change of regime. Furthermore, aid can also be diverted to non-state actors, and thus undermine the state's monopoly on violence, such as in Colombia during the 1990s and 2000s, where U.S. aid to the Colombian military was diverted by the military to paramilitary groups, leading to significant increases in paramilitary violence in municipalities located near military bases. The implication is that foreign aid can undermine the state by both feeding corruption of incumbent elites, and empowering groups outside of the state.

Moss, Todd, Gunilla Pettersson, and Nicolas van de Walle (2006) acknowledge the controversy over the effect of foreign aid that has developed in recent years. They argue that although there is a call for an increase in large aid efforts in Africa by the international community, this will actually create what they call an "aid-institutions paradox". This paradox is formed because of the large cash contributions that Western countries have given to African countries have created institutions that are "less accountable to their citizens and under less pressure to maintain popular legitimacy." They mention that the gradual decrease of aid may help foster long-lasting institutions, which is proven by the United States' efforts in Korea after the Cold War.

Berman, Eli, Felter, Shapiro, and Trolan (2013) also find similar evidence to support the paradox, stating that large U.S. aid attempts in African agriculture have only resulted in further conflict between citizens. Notably, small investments such as grants for schools have proven to decrease violence compared to large investments, which create "incentives to capture economic rents through violence." Furthermore, Binyavanga Wainaina (2009) likens Western aid to colonization, in which countries believe that large cash contributions to spur the African economy will lead to political development and less violence. In reality, these cash contributions do not invest in Africa's economic, political, and social growth.

=== Neotrusteeship ===
James Fearon and David Laitin suggest in "Neotrusteeship and the Problem of Weak States" that the problem of failed states can be addressed through a system of "neotrusteeship", which they compare to "postmodern imperialism". Fearon and Laitin's idea involves a combination of international and domestic organizations which seek to rebuild states. Fearon and Laitin start with the assumption that failed states comprise a collective action problem. Failed states impose negative externalities on the rest of the international system, like refugees displaced by war. It would be a net good for the international system if countries worked to develop and rebuild failed states. However, intervention is very costly, and no single nation has a strong enough incentive to act to solve the problem of a failed state. Therefore, international cooperation is necessary to solve this collective action problem.

Fearon and Laitin identify four main problems to achieving collective action to intervene in failed states:

1. Recruitment - getting countries to participate in and pay for interventions
2. Coordination - providing good communication between all of the peacekeeping countries
3. Accountability - ensuring that any peacekeeping countries that commit human rights abuses are held responsible
4. Exit - having some mechanism for the peacekeeping countries to withdraw

Fearon and Laitin do propose some solutions to these problems. To solve the recruitment problem, they argue for having a powerful state with security interests in the failed state to take the lead in the peacekeeping operations and serve a point role. Having a single state lead the peacekeeping operation would help solve the coordination problem. Empowering a UN body to investigate human rights abuses would solve the accountability problem. Finally, forcing the failed state to contribute funds to peacekeeping operations after several years can reduce the incentives of the peacekeepers to exit. Fearon and Laitin believe that multilateral interventions that solve the above four collective action problems will be more effective at rebuilding failed states through neotrusteeship.

=== Autonomous recovery ===
Jeremy Weinstein disagrees that peacekeeping is necessary to rebuild failed states, arguing that allowing failed states to recover on their own is often better. Weinstein fears that international intervention may prevent a state from developing strong internal institutions and capabilities. One of Weinstein's key arguments is that war leads to peace. By this, he means that peace agreements imposed by the international community tend to freeze in place power disparities that do not reflect reality. Weinstein believes that such a situation leaves a state ripe for future war, while if war were allowed to play out for one side to win decisively, future war would be much less likely. Weinstein also claims that war leads to the development of strong state institutions. Weinstein borrows from Tilly to make this argument, stating that wars require large expansions in state capabilities, so the more stable and capable states will win wars and survive in the international system through a process similar to natural selection. Weinstein uses evidence from Uganda's successful recovery following a guerrilla victory in a civil war, Eritrea's forceful secession from Ethiopia, and development in Somaliland and Puntland—autonomous regions of Somalia—to support his claims. Weinstein does note that lack of external intervention can lead to mass killings and other atrocities, but he emphasizes that preventing mass killings has to be weighed against the ensuing loss of long-term state capacity.

== Capability traps of failed states ==
A capability trap means that countries are progressing at a very slow pace in the expansion of state capability, even in the contemporary world, which is also the core problem of failed states. Many countries remain stuck in conditions of low productivity that many call "poverty traps". Economic growth is only one aspect of development; another key dimension of development is the expansion of the administrative capability of the state, the capability of governments to affect the course of events by implementing policies and programs. Capability traps close the space for novelty, establishing fixed best-practice agendas as the basis of evaluating failed states. Local agents are therefore excluded from building their own states, implicitly undermining the value-creating ideas of local leaders and front-line workers.

Matt, Lant, and Woolcock from the Harvard Kennedy School of Government propose an approach called the "Problem Driven Iterative Adaptation (PDIA)" to escape the capability traps. Given that many development initiatives fail to improve performance because they promote isomorphic mimicry, PDIA focuses on solving locally nominated and prioritized performance problems of failed states. It involves pursuing development interventions that engage broad sets of local agents to ensure the reforms are politically supportable and practically implementable.

While failed states are the source of numerous refugees, the chaotic emigration allowed by UN regulations and open border policies has contributed to human capital flight, or brain drain. Without sufficient professional and skilled workers, such as doctors, nurses, biologists, engineers, electricians, and so on, the severity of failed states tends to increase, leading to even more emigration. Similarly, policies that do not require third country resettlement on the same continent as failed states make eventual resettlement after the war, famine, or political collapse even less probable, as the distance, cost, and inconvenience of returning to home countries increase with distance and language change among refugee families. In Somalia, Afghanistan, and Yemen, the reform movements and modernization efforts are weakened when there are no effective refugee resettlement programs.

== Promoting good governance and combating further hostilities in failed states ==
=== Transnational crime and terrorism ===
According to U.S. Department of Justice trial attorney Dan E. Stigall, "the international community is confronted with an increasing level of transnational crime in which criminal conduct in one country has an impact in another or even several others. Drug trafficking, human trafficking, computer crimes, terrorism, and a host of other crimes can involve actors operating outside the borders of a country which might have a significant interest in stemming the activity in question and prosecuting the perpetrator".

A study by the Cligendael Center for Strategic Studies explains why states that are subject to failure serve as sanctuaries (used to plan, execute, support, and finance activities) for terrorist organizations. When the government does not know about the presence of the organization or if it is not able to weaken or remove the organization, the sanctuary is referred to as a "Terrorist Black Hole". However, next to governmental weakness, there needs to be "Terrorist Comparative Advantages" present for a region to be considered as a "Terrorist Black Hole". According to the study, social tensions, the legacy from civil conflict, geography, corruption, policy failure, and external factors contribute to governmental weakness. The comparative advantages are religion and ethnicity, the legacy from civil conflict, geography, economic opportunities, economic underdevelopment, and regional stimuli. Only the combinations of the two factors (governmental weakness and Terrorist Comparative Advantages) explain which regions terrorists use as sanctuaries.

Research by James Piazza of Pennsylvania State University finds evidence that nations affected by state failure experience and produce more terrorist attacks. Contemporary transnational crimes "take advantage of globalization, trade liberalization and exploding new technologies to perpetrate diverse crimes and to move money, goods, services and people instantaneously for purposes of perpetrating violence for political ends".

Contributing to previous research on the matter, Tiffany Howard looks at a different dimension of the connection between state failure and terrorism, based on evidence from Sub-Saharan Africa. She argues that "citizens of failed states are attracted to political violence because of the deteriorating conditions within this type of states". Focusing on individual citizens' decision-making patterns, it is suggested that "individuals living in failed states are attracted to political violence because the system is broken—the state has failed in its duty". This finding is based on empirical evidence using barometer survey data. This individual-level approach, which differs from previous research which has focused on the attractiveness of failed states for terrorists and insurgents finds that "failed states threaten an individual's survival, which ultimately drives them to obtain tangible political and economic resources through other means, which include the use of political violence". This finding has significant implications for the international community, such as the fact that "this pattern of deprivation makes individuals in these states more susceptible to the influence of internationally sponsored terrorist groups. As a consequence, failed states are breeding grounds for terrorists, who then export their radical ideologies to other parts of the world to create terrorist threats across the globe".

The link between state failure (and its characteristics) and terrorism, however, is not unanimously accepted in the scholarly literature. Research by Alberto Abadie, which looks at determinants of terrorism at the country level, suggests that the "terrorist risk is not significantly higher for poorer countries, once the effects of other country-specific characteristics such as the level of political freedom are taken into account". In fact, as the argument goes, "political freedom is shown to explain terrorism, but it does so in a non-monotonic way: countries in some intermediate range of political freedom are shown to be more prone to terrorism than countries with high levels of political freedom or countries with highly authoritarian regimes". While poverty and low levels of political freedom are not the main characteristics of failed states, they are nevertheless important ones. For this reason, Abadie's research represents a powerful critique of the idea that there is a link between state failure and terrorism. This link is also questioned by other scholars, such as Corinne Graff, who argues that 'there is simply no robust empirical relationship between poverty and terrorist attacks'.

Moreover, "problems of weakened states and transnational crime create an unholy confluence that is uniquely challenging. When a criminal operates outside the territory of an offended state, the offended state might ordinarily appeal to the state from which the criminal is operating to take some sort of action, such as to prosecute the offender domestically or extradite the offender so that he or she may face punishment in the offended state. Nonetheless, in situations in which a government is unable (or unwilling) to cooperate in the arrest or prosecution of a criminal, the offended state has few options for recourse".

== Examples ==
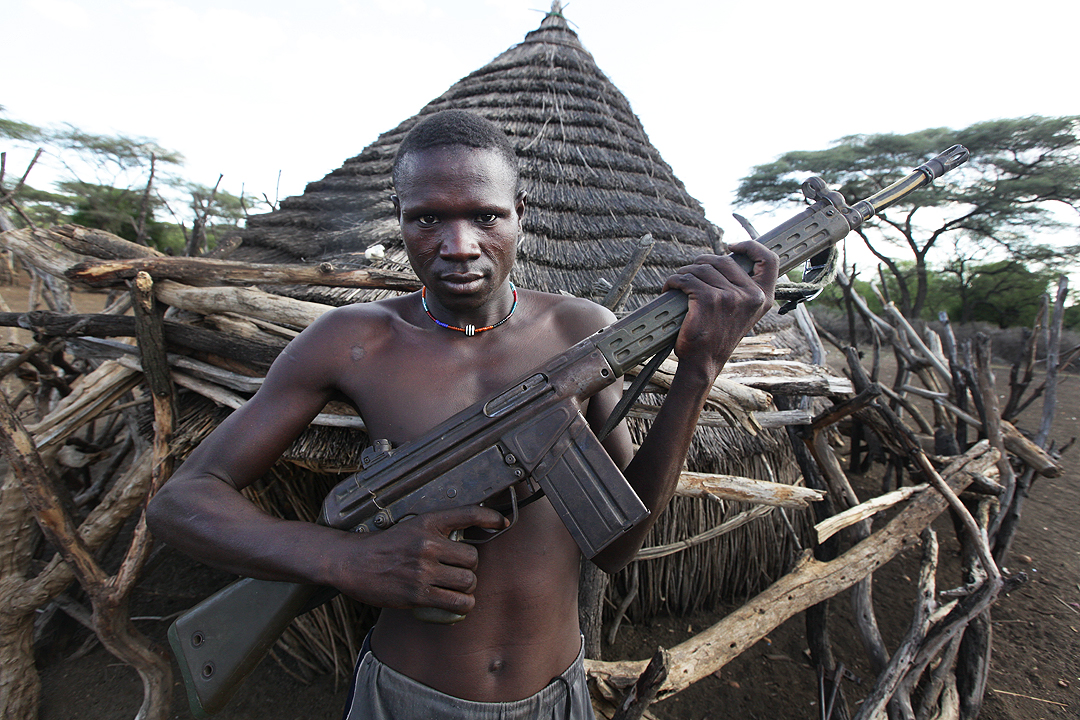
A South Sudanese man holding an HK G3 (taken during the South Sudanese civil war). Since 2018, the Bertelsmann Transformation Index has listed South Sudan as a "failed state".

A relevant contribution to the field of failed states and its attributes is made by Jack Goldstone in his 2008 Conflict Management and Peace Science paper entitled "Pathways to State Failure". He defines a failed state as one that has lost both its effectiveness and legitimacy. Effectiveness means the capability to carry out state functions such as providing security or levying taxes. Legitimacy means the support of important groups of the population. A state that retains one of these two aspects is not failing as such; however, it is in great danger of failing soon if nothing is done. He identifies five possible pathways to state failure:

1. Escalation of communal (ethnic or religious) group conflicts. Examples: Rwanda and SFR Yugoslavia
2. State predation (corrupt or crony corralling of resources at the expense of other groups). Examples: Cuba, Nicaragua, Philippines and Venezuela
3. Regional or guerrilla rebellion. Examples: Colombia and Vietnam
4. Democratic collapse (leading to civil war or coup d'état). Examples: Nigeria and Myanmar.
5. Succession or reform crisis in authoritarian states. Examples: Indonesia under Suharto and the Soviet Union under Gorbachev.

Larry Diamond in his 2006 paper "Promoting democracy in post-conflict and failed states" argues that weak and failed states pose distinctive problems for democracy promotion. In these states, the challenge is not only to pressure authoritarian state leaders to surrender power but rather to figure out how to regenerate legitimate power in the first place. There are mainly two distinct types of cases, and each of these two types of cases requires specific kinds of strategies for the promotion of good governance:

1. The post-conflict states that are emerging from external or civil war. A number of these countries, such as Nigeria, Mozambique, Sierra Leone, and Somalia, have been in Africa, while others have been in Latin America (Nicaragua, El Salvador, and much of Central America), in Asia (e.g., Cambodia), or in the Middle East (Lebanon, Algeria, and Iraq);
2. Countries that are in the midst of civil war or ongoing violent conflict, where central state authority has largely collapsed, as in the Democratic Republic of the Congo

Generally speaking, the order is the most important prerequisite for democracy promotion, which relies heavily on formal democratic mechanisms, particularly elections, to promote post-conflict state-building. In the absence of an effective state, there are basically three possibilities. First, if there has been a civil war and a rebel force has ultimately triumphed, then the vacuum may be filled by the rebellious army and political movement as it establishes control over the state. Second, there may be a patchwork of warlords and armies, with either no real central state (as in Somalia) or only a very weak one. In this situation, the conflict does not really end, but may wax and wane in a decentralized fashion, as in Afghanistan today. The third possibility is that an international actor or coalition of actors steps in to constitute temporary authority politically and militarily. This may be an individual country, a coalition, an individual country under the thin veneer of a coalition, or the United Nations acting through the formal architecture of a UN post-conflict mission.

Failed states according to the Bertelsmann Transformation Index (Note: Data from spreadsheet "Data BTI 2006-2026 (XLS)", failed states are in red under column "Failed State" in section "Political System")
| Country | '26 | '24 | '22 | '20 | '18 | '16 | '14 | '12 | '10 | '08 | '06 |
|---|---|---|---|---|---|---|---|---|---|---|---|
| Afghanistan (Note: Previously the Islamic Republic of Afghanistan, until 2021.) | | | Yes | | | | Yes | Yes | Yes | Yes | Yes |
| CAR | | Yes | Yes | Yes | Yes | Yes | Yes | Yes | Yes | Yes | Yes |
| Chad | | | | | | | | | | Yes | |
| DR Congo | Yes | Yes | Yes | Yes | Yes | Yes | Yes | Yes | Yes | Yes | Yes |
| Haiti | Yes | Yes | Yes | | | Yes | Yes | Yes | | | Yes |
| Iraq | | | | | | | | | | Yes | Yes |
| Ivory Coast | | | | | | | | | | Yes | Yes |
| Libya | Yes | Yes | Yes | Yes | Yes | Yes | | | | | |
| Myanmar | Yes | Yes | | | | | | | | | |
| Somalia | Yes | Yes | Yes | Yes | Yes | Yes | Yes | Yes | Yes | Yes | Yes |
| South Sudan | Yes | Yes | Yes | Yes | Yes | | | | n/a (Note: South Sudan was established as an independent state in 2011) | n/a | n/a |
| Sudan | Yes | Yes | Yes | | | | | | | | Yes |
| Syria | Yes | Yes | Yes | Yes | Yes | Yes | Yes | | | | |
| Yemen | Yes | Yes | Yes | Yes | Yes | Yes | | | | | |

== Criticisms of the concept ==
The term "failed state" has faced criticism along two main strands. The first argues that the term lends itself to overgeneralization by lumping together different governance problems amongst diverse countries and without accounting for variations of governance within states. The second is concerned with the political application of the term in order to justify military interventions and state-building based on a Western model of the state.

Olivier Nay, William Easterly, and Laura Freschi critique the concept of state failure as not having a coherent definition, with indices combining various indicators of state performance arbitrarily weighted to arrive at unclear and aggregated measurements of state fragility. Charles T. Call argues that the label of "failed state" has been applied so widely that it has been effectively rendered useless. As there has been little consensus over how to define failed states, the characteristics commonly used to identify a failing state are numerous and extremely diverse, from human rights violations, poverty, corruption to demographic pressures. This means that a wide range of highly divergent states are categorized together as failed (or failing) states. This can conceal the complexity of the specific weaknesses identified within individual states and result in a one-size-fits-all approach, typically focused on strengthening the state's capacity for order. Furthermore, the use of the term 'failed state' has been used by some foreign powers as a justification for invading a country or determining a specific prescriptive set of foreign policy goals. Following 2001, Call notes that the US stated that failed states were one of the greatest security threats facing the country, based on the assumption that a country with weak or non-existent state institutions would provide a safe haven for terrorists, and act as a breeding ground for extremism.

Call suggests that instead of branding countries as failed states, they could be categorized in more relevant, understandable terms. For example, a "collapsed state" would refer to a country where the state apparatus completely falls apart and ceases to exist for a couple of months. This would only apply to a country where absolutely no basic functions of the state were working, and non-state actors were carrying out such tasks. A "weak state" could be used for states where informal institutions carry out more of the public services and channeling of goods than formal state institutions. A "war-torn" state might not be functioning because of conflict, but this does not necessarily imply it is a collapsed state. Rotberg argues that all failed states are experiencing some form of armed conflict. However, the challenges to the state can be very different depending on the type of armed conflict, whether it encompasses the country as a whole and large territories, or is specifically focused on one regional area. Another type of state that has been traditionally put under the umbrella term "failed state" could be an "authoritarian state". While authoritarian leaders might come to power by violent means, they may ward off opposition once in power and, as such, ensure there is little violence within their regime. Call argues that the circumstances and challenges facing state-building in such regimes are very different from those posed in a state in civil war. These four alternative definitions highlight the many different circumstances that can lead a state to be categorized under the umbrella term of "failed state", and the danger of adopting prescriptive one-size-fits-all policy approaches to very different situations. As a result of these taxonomical difficulties, Wynand Greffrath posits a nuanced approach to "state dysfunction" as a form of political decay, which emphasizes qualitative theoretical analysis.

Call attempts to abandon the concept of state failure altogether, arguing that it promotes an unclear understanding of what state failure means. Instead, Call advances a "gap framework" as an alternative means of assessing the effectiveness of state administration. This framework builds on his previous criticism of the state failure concept as overly generalized. Call thus asserts that it is often inappropriately applied as a catch-all theory to explain the plight of states that are in fact subject to diverse national contexts and do not possess identical problems. Utilizing such an evaluation to support policy prescriptions, Call posits, is then responsible for poor policy formulation and outcomes. As such, Call's proposed framework develops the concept of state failure through the codification of three "gaps" in resource provision that the state is not able to address when it is in the process of failure: capacity, when state institutions lack the ability to effectively deliver basic goods and services to its population; security, when the state is unable to provide security to its population under the threat of armed groups; and legitimacy when a "significant portion of its political elites and society reject the rules regulating power and the accumulation and distribution of wealth."

Instead of attempting to quantify the degree of failure of a state, the gap framework provides a three-dimensional scope useful to analyze the interplay between the government and the society in states in a more analytical way. Call does not necessarily suggest that states that suffer from the challenges of the three gaps should be identified as failed states but instead presents the framework as an alternative to the state failure concept as a whole. Although Call recognizes that the gap concept in itself has limits since often states face two or more of the gap challenges, his conceptual proposition presents a useful way for more precisely identifying the challenges within a society and the policy prescriptions that are more likely to be effective for external and international actors to implement.

Drawing on five case studies — Afghanistan, Somalia, Liberia, Sudan, and the Niger Delta region of Nigeria — Morten Bøås and Kathleen M. Jennings argue that "the use of the 'failed state' label is inherently political and based primarily on Western perceptions of Western security and interests". They suggest that Western policy-makers attribute the "failed" label to those states in which "recession and informalisation of the state is perceived to be a threat to Western interests". Furthermore, this suggests hypocrisy among Western policy-makers: the same forms of perceived dysfunction that lead to some states being labeled as failed are in turn met with apathy or are knowingly expedited in other states where such dysfunction is assessed to be beneficial to Western interests. In fact, "this feature of state functioning is not only accepted, but also to a certain degree facilitated, as it creates an enabling environment for business and international capital. These cases are not branded 'failed states'".

== See also ==
- Banana republic
- Democracy indices
- Fragile state
- Free and fair election
- Mafia state
- Ochlocracy
- Pariah state
- Rogue state
- Stabilization of fragile states
- State collapse
