= Marina Ottaway =

Academic

Marina S. Ottaway teaches and researches at the Woodrow Wilson Center in Washington, D.C. Her research interests include the politics of development, with particular reference to Africa, the Balkans, and the Middle East.

Before she joined the Wilson Center, she spent 14 years at the Carnegie Endowment, where she helped start up the Middle East Program. She has also taught at Georgetown University, the Johns Hopkins School for Advanced International Studies, the American University in Cairo, and three other universities, all in Africa.

Ottaway has a doctorate from Columbia University.

== Publications ==
- Yemen on the Brink, co-edited with Christopher Boucek, Carnegie, 2010, 110 pages, ISBN 978 0870032530.
- "Guide to Egypt’s Transition" (website) and "Iraqi Elections 2010" (website).
- Getting to Pluralism: Political Actors in the Arab World, co-authored with Amr Hamzawy, Carnegie, 2009, ISBN 978-0870032448. Reviewed by Michal Onderco in Association for International Affairs, 2 January 2010.
- Beyond the Façade: Political Reform in the Arab World, edited with Julia Choucair-Vizoso, Carnegie, 2008.
- Uncharted Journey: Promoting Democracy in the Middle East, edited with Thomas Carothers, Carnegie, 2005.
- Democracy Challenged: The Rise of Semi-Authoritarianism, Carnegie, 2003, 256 pages, ISBN 978-0870031953.
- Funding Virtue: Civil Society Aid and Democracy Promotion, edited with Thomas Carothers, Carnegie, 2000. Reviewed by M Holt Ruffin inVoluntas, the International Journal of Voluntary and Nonprofit Organizations, March 2002, p. 94.
- Africa’s New Leaders: Democracy or State Reconstruction?, Carnegie, 1999, 138 pages, ISBN 978-0870031342.
- Democracy in Africa: The Hard Road Ahead, Lynne Riener, 1997. 176 pages. Reviewed by Nicholas de Torrente in Journal of International Studies.
