= Environmental determinism =

Theory that a society's development is predetermined by its physical environment

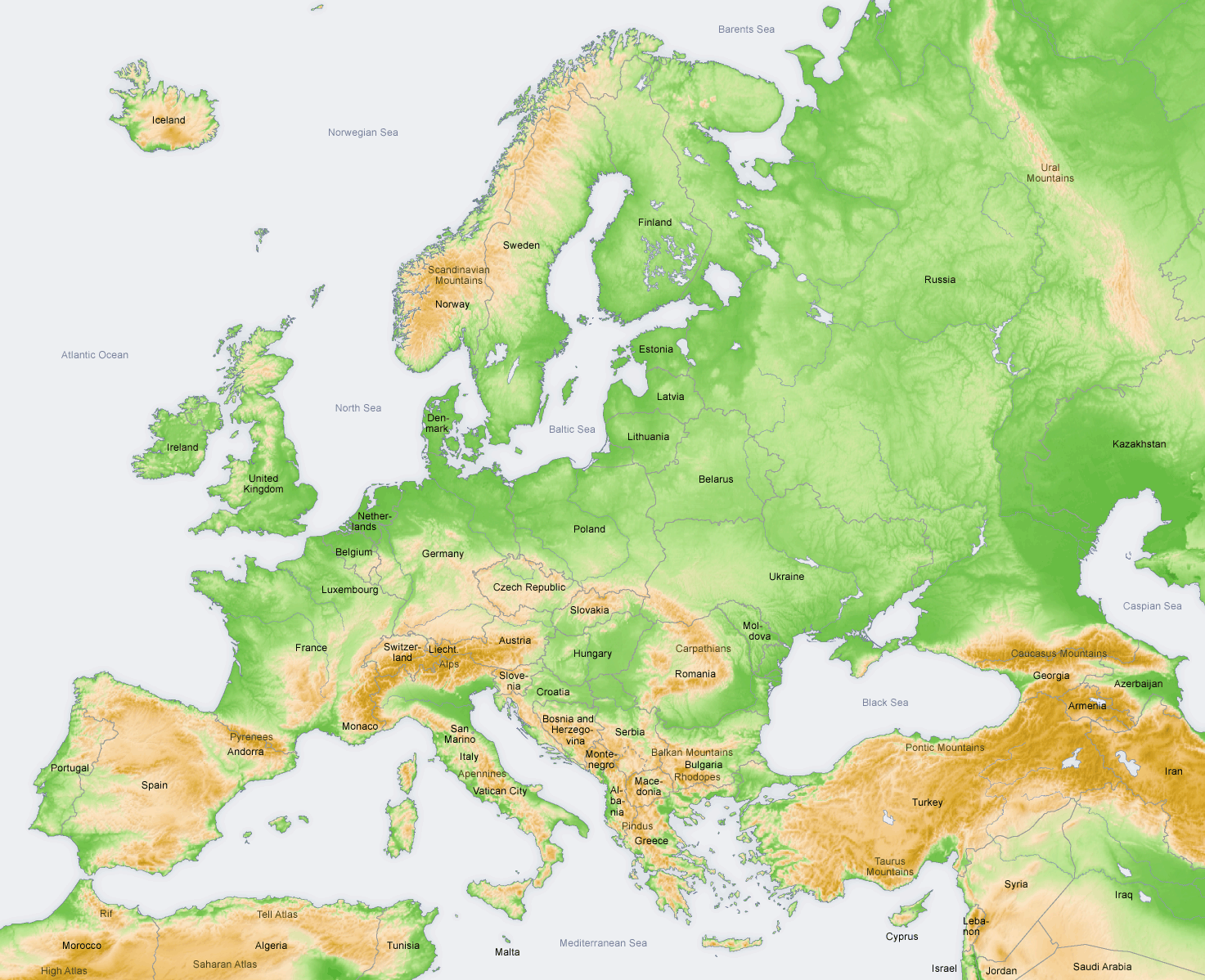
Topographical map of Europe

Environmental determinism (also known as climatic determinism or geographical determinism) is the study of how the physical environment predisposes societies and states towards particular economic or social developmental (or even more generally, cultural) trajectories. Jared Diamond, Jeffrey Herbst, Ian Morris, and other social scientists sparked a revival of the theory during the late twentieth and early twenty-first centuries. This "neo-environmental determinism" school of thought examines how geographic and ecological forces influence state-building, economic development, and institutions. While archaic versions of the geographic interpretation were used to encourage colonialism and eurocentrism, modern figures like Diamond use this approach to reject the racism in these explanations. Diamond argues that European powers were able to colonize, due to unique advantages bestowed by their environment, as opposed to any kind of inherent superiority. Michał Apollo demonstrated that guest-host relations in mountain tourism are determined by altitude (vertical) and distance from the main route (horizontal).

== History ==
=== Classical and medieval periods ===
Early theories of environmental determinism in Ancient China, Ancient Greece, and Ancient Rome suggested that environmental features completely determined the physical and intellectual qualities of whole societies. Guan Zhong (720–645 BC), an early chancellor in China, held that the qualities of major rivers shaped the character of surrounding peoples. Swift and twisting rivers made people "greedy, uncouth, and warlike". The ancient Greek philosopher Hippocrates wrote a similar account in his treatise "Airs, Waters, Places".

In this text, Hippocrates explained how the ethnicities of people were connected to their environment. He argued that there existed a connection between the geography surrounding people and their ethnicity. Hippocrates described the effects of different climates, customs, and diets on people and how this affected their behaviors, attitudes, as well as their susceptibility to diseases and illnesses.

For example, he explains the Asian race were less warlike compared to other civilizations due to their climate. He attributes this to the fact that there are “no great shifts in the weather, which is neither hot nor cold but temperate” and how the climate conditions allow Asians to live without shock or mental anxieties.

According to Hippocrates, anxieties and shocks promote passion and recklessness in humans, but since Asians lack this, they remain feeble. This connects to the manner in which Asians are ruled, stating they do not “rule themselves nor are autonomous but subjects to a despot, there is no self-interest in appearing warlike.” In the later chapters of his work, he contrasts this attitude to that of Europeans. He claims that laziness can be attributed as an effect of uniform climate and that “Endurance of both the body and soul comes from change. Also cowardice increases softness and laziness, while courage engenders endurance and a work ethic.”

Since Europeans experience more fluctuations in their climate, they do not remain accustomed to their climate and are forced to endure constant change. Hippocrates claims that this is reflected in a person's character and ties that to the character of Europeans, explaining that “For this reason, those dwelling in Europe are more effective fighters.”

According to Hippocrates, there are also physical manifestations of environmental determinism in people. He presents the connection between the nature of the land and its people, arguing that the physique and nature of a man are formed and influenced by it. He explains one of the ways this connection is exhibited by stating, “Where the land is rich, soft, and well watered, and the waters are near the surface so that they become hot in the summer and cold in the winter, and where the climate is nice, there the men are flabby and jointless, bloated and lazy and mostly cowards.” He notes the nomadic Scythians as examples of a civilization that possesses these traits. In a previous section of his text, he notes how the Scythians are flabby and bloated and that they possess the most bloated bellies of all peoples. He also comments that all males are identical and all females are identical in appearance, males with males and females with females. He attributes this to the climate conditions they live in and the fact that they experience identical summer and winter seasons. The lack of change leads them to wear the same clothes, eat the same fare, breathe the same damp air, and refrain from labor. This continuity and the lack of strong shifts in climate is what Hippocrates identifies as the cause for their appearance. Since the Scythians are not accustomed to experiencing sudden changes, they cannot develop the body or soul to endure physical activity. In comparison, locations “where the land is barren, dry, harsh, and harried by storms in the winter or scorched by the sun in the summers, there one would find strong, lean, well-defined. muscular, and hairy men.” These characteristics would also reflect on their character, as they would possess hard-working, intelligent, and independent natures as well as being more skilled and warlike than others.

Hippocrates also argues that the physical appearance caused by people's environments affect the reproduction and fertility of civilizations, which affects future generations. He presents the appearance and bodies of the Scythians as having a negative impact on the fertility of their civilization. Hippocrates argues that due to their bloated stomachs and “extremely soft and cold lower bellies” Scythian men are not eager for intercourse and due to this condition, “highly unlikely to be able to satisfy his lusts.” He further argues that the behavior of the Scythian men and their horseback riding customs also affected their fertility because the “constant bouncing on horseback has rendered Scythian men unfit for sex” and made them infertile.

Women, according to Hippocrates are also infertile because of their physical condition and because they are fat and bloated. Hippocrates claims that due to their physique, women have wombs that are too wet and “incapable of absorbing a man's seed.” This he explains, affects their fertility and their reproduction as well as causes other problems in the function of their reproductive system, for example “their monthly purge is also not as it should be, but is infrequent as scanty.” Due to their fat, their wombs are clogged which blocks male seed. All of these conditions and traits are evidence that supports his claim that the Scythian race is infertile and acts as an example of how the concept of environmental determinism manifests.

Writers in the medieval Middle East also produced theories of environmental determinism. The Afro-Arab writer al-Jahiz argued that the skin color of people and livestock were determined by the water, soil, and heat of their environments. He compared the color of black basalt in the northern Najd to the skin color of the peoples living there to support his theory.

Ibn Khaldun, the Arab sociologist and polymath, similarly linked skin color to environmental factors. In his Muqaddimah (1377), he wrote that black skin was due to the hot climate of sub-Saharan Africa and not due to African lineage. He thereby challenged Hamitic theories of race that held that the sons of Ham (son of Noah) were cursed with black skin. Many writings of Ibn Khaldun were translated during the colonial era in order to advance the colonial propaganda machine.

Ibn Khaldun believed that the physical environment influenced non-physical factors in addition to skin color. He argued that soil, climate, and food determined whether people were nomadic or sedentary, and what customs and ceremonies they held. His writings may have influenced the later writings of Montesquieu during the 18th century through the traveller Jean Chardin, who travelled to Persia and described theories resembling those of Ibn Khaldun.

=== Western colonial period ===
Environmental determinism has been widely criticized as a tool to legitimize colonialism, racism, and imperialism in Africa, The Americas, and Asia. Environmental determinism enabled geographers to scientifically justify the supremacy of white European races and the naturalness of imperialism. The scholarship bolstered religious justifications and in some cases superseded them during the late 19th century.

Many writers, including Thomas Jefferson, supported and legitimized African colonization by arguing that tropical climates made the people uncivilized. Jefferson argued that tropical climates encouraged laziness, relaxed attitudes, promiscuity and generally degenerative societies, while the frequent variability in the weather of the middle and northern latitudes led to stronger work ethics and civilized societies. Adolf Hitler also made use of this theory to extol the supremacy of the Nordic race.

Defects of character supposedly generated by tropical climates were believed to be inheritable under the Lamarckian theory of inheritance of acquired characteristics, a discredited precursor to the Darwinian theory of natural selection. The theory begins with the observation that an organism faced with environmental pressures may undergo physiological changes during its lifetime through the process of acclimatization. Lamarckianism suggested that those physiological changes may be passed directly to offspring, without the need for offspring to develop the trait in the same manner.

Geographical societies like the Royal Geographical Society and the Société de géographie supported imperialism by funding explorers and other colonial proponents. Scientific societies acted similarly. Acclimatization societies directly supported colonial enterprises and enjoyed their benefits. The writings of Lamarck provided theoretical backing for the acclimatization doctrines. The Société Zoologique d'Acclimatation was largely founded by Isidore Geoffroy Saint-Hilaire—son of Étienne Geoffroy Saint-Hilaire, a close colleague and supporter of Lamarck.

Ellen Churchill Semple, a prominent environmental determinism scholar, applied her theories in a case study which focused on the Philippines, where she mapped civilization and wildness onto the topography of the islands. Other scholars argued that climate and topography caused specific character traits to appear in a given populations. Scholars thereby imposed racial stereotypes on whole societies. Imperial powers rationalized labor exploitation by claiming that tropical peoples were morally inferior.

The role of environmental determinism in rationalizing and legitimizing racism, ethnocentrism and economic inequality has consequently drawn strong criticism.

David Landes similarly condemns of what he terms the unscientific moral geography of Ellsworth Huntington. He argues that Huntington undermined geography as a science by attributing all human activity to physical influences so that he might classify civilizations hierarchically – favoring those civilizations he considered best.

=== Late-20th-century growth of neo-environmental determinism ===
Environmental determinism was revived in the late-twentieth century as neo-environmental determinism, a new term coined by the social scientist and critic Andrew Sluyter. Sluyter argues that neo-environmental determinism does not sufficiently break with its classical and imperial precursors. Others have argued that in a certain sense a Darwinian approach to determinism is useful in shedding light on human nature.

Neo-environmental determinism examines how the physical environment predisposes societies and states towards particular trajectories of economic and political development. It explores how geographic and ecological forces influence state-building, economic development, and institutions. It also addresses fears surrounding the effects of modern climate change. Jared Diamond was influential in the resurgence of environmental determinism due to the popularity of his book Guns, Germs, and Steel, which addresses the geographic origins of state formation prior to 1500 A.D.

Neo-environmental determinism scholars debate how much the physical environment shapes economic and political institutions. Economic historians Stanley Engerman and Kenneth Sokoloff argue that factor endowments greatly affected "institutional" development in the Americas, by which they mean the tendency to more free (democratic, free market) or unfree (dictatorial, economically restrictive) regimes.

In contrast, Daron Acemoglu, Simon Johnson, and James A. Robinson underscore that the geographic factors most influenced institutional development during early state formation and colonialism. They argue that geographic differences cannot explain economic growth disparities after 1500 A.D. directly, except through their effects on economic and political institutions.

Economists Jeffrey Sachs and John Luke Gallup have examined the direct impacts of geographic and climatic factors on economic development, especially the role of geography on the cost of trade and access to markets, the disease environment, and agricultural productivity.

The contemporary global warming crisis has also impacted environmental determinism scholarship. Jared Diamond draws similarities between the changing climate conditions that brought down the Easter Island civilization and modern global warming in his book Collapse: How Societies Choose to Fail or Succeed. Alan Kolata, Charles Ortloff, and Gerald Huag similarly describe the Tiwanaku empire and Maya civilization collapses as caused by climate events such as drought. Peter deMenocal, Just as the earthworks in the deserts of the west grew out of notions of landscape painting, the growth of public art stimulated artists to engage the urban landscape as another environment and also as a platform to engage ideas and concepts about the environment to a larger audience. A scientist at the Lamont–Doherty Earth Observatory at Columbia University, writes that societal collapse due to climate change is possible today.

== Ecological and geographic impacts on early state formation ==
=== Effects of species endowments, climate, and continental axes prior to 1500 ===
In the Pulitzer Prize winning Guns, Germs, and Steel (1999), author Jared Diamond points to geography as the answer to why certain states were able to grow and develop faster and stronger than others. His theory cited the natural environment and raw materials a civilization had as factors for success, instead of popular century-old claims of racial and cultural superiority. Diamond says that these natural endowments began with the dawn of man, and favored Eurasian civilizations due to their location along similar latitudes, suitable farming climate, and early animal domestication.

Diamond argues that early states located along the same latitude lines were uniquely suited to take advantage of similar climates, making it easier for crops, livestock, and farming techniques to spread. Crops such as wheat and barley were simple to grow and easy to harvest, and regions suitable for their cultivation saw high population densities and the growth of early cities. The ability to domesticate herd animals, which had no natural fear of humans, high birth rates, and an innate hierarchy, gave some civilizations the advantages of free labor, fertilizers, and war animals. The east–west orientation of Eurasia allowed for knowledge capital to spread quickly, and writing systems to keep track of advanced farming techniques gave people the ability to store and build upon a knowledge base across generations. Craftsmanship flourished as a surplus of food from farming allowed some groups the freedom to explore and create, which led to the development of metallurgy and advances in technology. While the advantageous geography helped to develop early societies, the close proximity in which humans and their animals lived led to the spread of disease across Eurasia. Over several centuries, rampant disease decimated populations, but ultimately led to disease resistant communities. Diamond suggests that these chains of causation led to European and Asian civilizations holding a dominant place in the world today.

Diamond uses the Spanish conquistadors' conquering of the Americas as a case study for his theory. He argues that the Europeans took advantage of their environment to build large and complex states complete with advanced technology and weapons. The Incans and other native groups were not as fortunate, suffering from a north–south orientation that prevented the flow of goods and knowledge across the continent. The Americas also lacked the animals, metals, and complex writing systems of Eurasia which prevented them from achieving the military or biological protections needed to fight off the European threat.

Diamond's theory has not gone without criticism.

- It was notably attacked for not providing enough detail regarding causation of environmental variables, and for leaving logical gaps in reasoning. Geographer Andrew Sluyter argued that Diamond was just as ignorant as the racists of the 19th century. Sluyter challenged Diamond's theory since it seemed to suggest that environmental conditions lead to gene selection, which then lead to wealth and power for certain civilizations. Sluyter also attacks environmental determinism by condemning it as a highly studied and popular field based entirely on Diamond's "quick and dirty" combination of natural and social sciences.
- Daron Acemoglu and James A. Robinson similarly criticized Diamond's work in their book Why Nations Fail. They contend that the theory is outdated and can not effectively explain differences in economic growth after 1500 or the reasons why states that are geographically close can exhibit vast differences in wealth. They instead favored an institutional approach in which a society's success or failure is based on the underlying strength of its institutions. Writing in response to institutional arguments, Diamond agreed that institutions are an important cause, but argued that their development is often heavily influenced by geography, such as the clear regional pattern in Africa where the northern and southern countries are wealthier than those in the tropical regions.

=== Geography and pre-colonial African state-building ===
==== The effects of climate and land abundance on the development of state systems ====
In his book States and Power in Africa, political scientist Jeffrey Herbst argues that environmental conditions help explain why, in contrast to other parts of the world such as Europe, many pre-colonial societies in Africa did not develop into dense, settled, hierarchical societies with strong state control that competed with neighboring states for people and territory.

Herbst argues that the European state-building experience was highly idiosyncratic because it occurred under systemic geographic pressures that favored wars of conquest – namely, passable terrain, land scarcity, and high-population densities. Faced with the constant threat of war, political elites sent administrators and armed forces from the urban centers into rural hinterlands to raise taxes, recruit soldiers, and fortify buffer zones. European states consequently developed strong institutions and capital-periphery linkages.

By contrast, geographic and climatic factors in pre-colonial Africa made establishing absolute control over particular pieces of land prohibitively costly. For example, because African farmers relied on rain-fed agriculture and consequently invested little in particular pieces of land, they could easily flee rulers rather than fight.

Some early African empires, like the Ashanti Empire, successfully projected power over large distances by building roads. The largest pre-colonial polities arose in the Sudanian Savanna belt of West Africa because the horses and camels could transport armies over the terrain. In other areas, no centralized political organizations existed above the village level.

African states did not develop more responsive institutions under colonial rule or post-independence. Colonial powers had little incentive to develop state institutions to protect their colonies against invasion, having divided up Africa at the Berlin Conference. The colonizers instead focused on exploiting natural resources and exploitation colonialism.

==== The effect of disease environments ====
Dr. Marcella Alsan argues the prevalence of the tsetse fly hampered early state formation in Africa. Because the tsetse virus was lethal to cows and horses, communities afflicted by the insect could not rely on the agricultural benefits provided by livestock. African communities were prevented from stockpiling agricultural surplus, working the land, or eating meat. Because the disease environment hindered the formation of farming communities, early African societies resembled small hunter-gatherer groups and not centralized states.

The relative availability of livestock animals enabled European societies to form centralized institutions, develop advanced technologies, and create an agricultural network. They could rely on their livestock to reduce the need for manual labor. Livestock also diminished the comparative advantage of owning slaves. African societies relied on the use of rival tribesmen as slave labor where the fly was prevalent, which impeded long-term societal cooperation.

Alsan argues that her findings support the view of Kenneth Sokoloff and Stanley Engerman that factor endowments shape state institutions.

=== Llamas, chuño and the Inca Empire ===
Carl Troll has argued that the development of the Inca state in the central Andes was aided by conditions that allow for the elaboration of the staple food chuño. Chuño, which can be stored for long times, is made of potato dried at freezing temperatures that are common at nighttime in the southern Peruvian highlands. Contradicting the link between the Inca state and dried potato is that other crops such as maize can also be preserved with only sun. Troll also argued that llamas, the Incas' pack animal, can be found in their largest numbers in this very same region. It is worth considering that the maximum extent of the Inca Empire coincided with the greatest distribution of alpacas and llamas. As a third point Troll pointed out irrigation technology as advantageous to the Inca state-building. While Troll theorized environmental influences on the Inca Empire, he opposed environmental determinism, arguing that culture lay at the core of the Inca civilization.

== Effects of geography on political regimes ==
Numerous scholars have argued that geographic and environmental factors affect the types of political regime that societies develop, and shape paths towards democracy versus dictatorship.

=== The disease environment ===
Daron Acemoglu, Simon Johnson, and James A. Robinson have achieved notoriety for demonstrating that diseases and terrain have helped shape tendencies towards democracy versus dictatorship, and through these economic growth and development. In their book Why Nations Fail, as well as a paper titled The Colonial Origins of Comparative Development: An Empirical Investigation, the authors show that the colonial disease environment shaped the tendency for Europeans to settle the territory or not, and whether they developed systems of agriculture and labor markets that were free and egalitarian versus exploitative and unequal. These choices of political and economic institutions, they argue, shaped tendencies to democracy or dictatorship over the following centuries.

=== Factor endowments ===
In order to understand the impact and creation of institutions during early state formation, economic historians Stanley Engerman and Kenneth Sokoloff examined the economic development of the Americas during colonization. They found that the beginnings of the success or failure of American colonies were based on the specific factor endowments available to each colony. These endowments included the climate, soil profitability, crop potential, and even native population density. Institutions formed to take advantage of these factor endowments. Those that were most successful developed an ability to change and adapt to new circumstances over time. For example, the development of economic institutions, such as plantations, was caused by the need for a large property and labor force to harvest sugar and tobacco, while smallholder farms thrived in areas where scale economies were absent. Though initially profitable, plantation colonies also suffered from large dependent populations over time as slaves and natives were given few rights, limiting the population available to drive future economic progress and technological development.

Factor endowments also influenced political institutions. This is demonstrated by the plantation owning elite using their power to secure long lasting government institutions and pass legislation that leads to the persistence of inequality in society. Engerman and Sokoloff found smallholder economies to be more equitable since they discouraged an elite class from forming, and distributed political power democratically to most land-owning males. These differences in political institutions were also highly influential in the development of schools, as more equitable societies demanded an educated population to make political decisions. Over time these institutional advantages had exponential effects, as colonies with educated and free populations were better suited to take advantage of technological change during the industrial revolution, granting country wide participation into the booming free-market economy.

Engerman and Sokoloff conclude that while institutions heavily influenced the success of each colony, no individual type of institution is the source of economic and state growth. Other variables such as factor endowments, technologies, and the creation of property rights are just as crucial in societal development. To encourage state success an institution must be adaptable and suited to find the most economical source of growth. The authors also argue that while not the only means for success, institutional development has long lasting-economic and social effects on the state.

Other prominent scholars contest the extent to which factor endowments determine economic and political institutions.

American economists William Easterly and Ross Levine argue that economic development does not solely depend on geographic endowments—like temperate climates, disease-resistant climates, or soil favorable to cash crops. They stress that there is no evidence that geographic endowments influence country incomes other than through institutions. They observe that states like Burundi are poor—despite favorable environmental conditions like abundant rainfall and fertile soil—because of the damage wrought by colonialism. Other states like Canada with fewer endowments are more stable and have higher per capita incomes.

Easterly and Levine further observe that studies of how the environment directly influences land and labor were tarred by racist theories of underdevelopment, but that does not mean that such theories can be automatically discredited. They argue that Diamond correctly stresses the importance of germs and crops in the very long-run of societal technological development. They find that regression results support the findings of Jared Diamond and David Landes that factor endowments influence GDP per capita. However, Easterly and Levine's findings most support the view that long-lasting institutions most shape economic development outcomes. Relevant institutions include private property rights and the rule of law.

Jeffrey B. Nugent and James A. Robinson similarly challenge scholars like Barrington Moore who hold that certain factor endowments and agricultural preconditions necessarily lead to particular political and economic organizations. Nugent and Robinson show that coffee economies in South America pursued radically different paths of political and economic development during the nineteenth century.

Some coffee states, like Costa Rica and Colombia, passed laws like the Homestead Act of 1862. They favored smallholders, held elections, maintained small militaries, and fought fewer wars. Smallholder arrangements prompted widespread government investment in education. Other states like El Salvador and Guatemala produced coffee on plantations, where individuals were more disenfranchised. Whether a state became a smallholder or plantation state depended not on factor endowments but on norms established under colonialism—namely, legal statutes determining access to land, the background of the governing elites, and the degree of permitted political competition. Nugent and Robinson thereby conclude that factor endowments alone do not determine economic or political institutions.

== Direct effects of geography on economic development ==
=== Effects of terrain on trade and productivity ===
Historians have also noted population densities seem to concentrate on coastlines and that states with large coasts benefit from higher average incomes compared to those in landlocked countries. Coastal living has proven advantageous for centuries as civilizations relied on the coastline and waterways for trade, irrigation, and as a food source. Conversely, countries without coastlines or navigable waterways are often less urbanized and have less growth potential due to the slow movement of knowledge capital, technological advances, and people. They also have to rely on costly and time-consuming over-land trade, which usually results in lack of access to regional and international markets, further hindering growth. Additionally, interior locations tend to have both lower population densities and labor-productivity levels. However, factors including fertile soil, nearby rivers, and ecological systems suited for rice or wheat cultivation can give way to dense inland populations.

Nathan Nunn and Diego Puga note that though rugged terrain usually makes farming difficult, prevents travel, and limits societal growth, early African states used harsh terrain to their advantage. The authors used a terrain ruggedness index to quantify topographic heterogeneity across several regions of Africa, while simultaneously controlling for variables such as diamond availability and soil fertility. The results suggest that historically, ruggedness is strongly correlated with decreased income levels across the globe and has negatively impacted state growth over time. They note that harsh terrain limited the flow of trade goods and decreased crop availability, while isolating communities from developing knowledge capital. However, the study also demonstrated that the terrain had positive effects on some African communities by protecting them from the slave trade. Communities that were located in areas with rugged features could successfully hide from slave traders and protect their homes from being destroyed. The study found that in these areas rugged topography produced long-term economic benefits and aided post-colonial state formation.

=== Effects of climate on productivity ===
The impact that climate and water navigability have on economic growth and GDP per capita was studied by notable scholars including Paul Krugman, Jared Diamond, and Jeffrey Sachs. By using variables to measure environmental determinism, such as climate, land composition, latitude, and the presence of infectious disease, they account for trends in worldwide economic development on local, regional and global scales. To do so, they measure economic growth with GDP per capita adjusted to purchasing power parity (PPP), while also taking into consideration population density and labor productivity.

Economic historians have found that societies in the Northern Hemisphere experience higher standards of living, and that as latitude increases north or south from the equator, levels of real GDP per capita also increases. Climate is closely correlated with agricultural production since without ideal weather conditions, agriculture alone will not produce the surplus supply needed to build and maintain economies. Locations with hot tropical climates often suffer underdevelopment due to low fertility of soils, excessive plant transpiration, ecological conditions favoring infectious diseases, and unreliable water supply. These factors can cause tropical zones to suffer a 30% to 50% decrease in productivity relative to temperate climate zones. Tropical infectious diseases that thrive in hot and moist equatorial climates cause thousands of deaths each year. They are also an economic drain on society due to high medical costs, and the unwillingness of foreign capital to invest in a sickly state. Because infectious diseases like malaria often need a warm ecology for growth, states in the mid to high latitudes are naturally protected from the devastating effects of those diseases.

=== Climatic determinism and colonization ===
Climatic determinism, otherwise referred to as the equatorial paradox, is an aspect of economic geography. According to this theory, about 70% of a country's economic development can be predicted by the distance between that country and the equator, and that the further from the equator a country is located, the more developed it tends to be. The theory is the central argument of Philip M. Parker's Physioeconomics: The Basis for Long-Run Economic Growth, in which he argues that since humans originated as tropical mammals, those who relocated to colder climates attempt to restore their physiological homeostasis through wealth-creation. This act includes producing more food, better housing, heating, warm clothes, etc. Conversely, humans that remained in warmer climates are more physiologically comfortable simply due to temperature, and so have less incentive to work to increase their comfort levels. Therefore, according to Parker GDP is a direct product of the natural compensation of humans to their climate.

Political geographers have used climatic determinism ideology to attempt to predict and rationalize the history of civilization, as well as to explain existing or perceived social and cultural divides between peoples. Some argue that one of the first attempts geographers made to define the development of human geography across the globe was to relate a country's climate to human development. Using this ideology, many geographers believed they were able "to explain and predict the progress of human societies". This led to warmer climate zones being "seen as producing less civilized, more degenerate peoples, in need of salvation by western colonial powers."

Ellsworth Huntington also travelled continental Europe in hopes of better understanding the connection between climate and state success, publishing his findings in The Pulse of Asia, and further elaborating in Civilization and Climate. Like the political geographers, a crucial component of his work was the belief that the climate of North-western Europe was ideal, with areas further north being too cold, and areas further south being too hot, resulting in lazy, laid-back populations. These ideas were powerful connections to colonialism, and may have played a role in the creation of the 'other' and the literature that many used to justify taking advantage of less advanced nations. Huntington also argued that climate can lead to the demise of even advanced civilizations through drought, food insecurity, and damages to economic production.

=== Environmental determinism in mountain tourism ===
Vertical and horizontal zones have a decisive influence on social, cultural, and economic aspects of mountain tourism. Altitude has a significant impact on the environment, altering temperature, pressure, and atmospheric conditions, which in turn affects plant and animal life. The altitude at which people live has a significant impact on social, cultural, and economic differences, affecting everything from daily life to social structures. A pioneering study by Apollo et al proved that the attitude of mountain populations towards tourism changes with increasing altitude. An advanced and multidimensional study conducted in the Mount Everest region confirmed that altitude determinism plays a major role in guest-host relations.

== See also ==
- Economic geography – Subfield of human geography and economics
- Cultural geography – Subfield within human geography
- Cultural economics – Branch of economics
- Cultural evolution – Evolutionary theory of social change
- Cultural psychology – How cultures reflect and shape their psychology
- Cultural materialism (anthropology) – Anthropological research orientation
- Development geography – Branch of geography
- Environmental racism – Environmental injustice that occurs within a racialized context
- Factor endowment
- Political geography – Study of the spatial outcomes of political processes
- Positivism – Empiricist philosophical theory
- Social determinism – Theory of human behavior
- State building – Term in social sciences and humanities
- Hereditarianism – View that genetics plays a major role in determining human behavior
- Analysis of Western European colonialism and colonization
- Colonialism – Control by distant groups
- Sociological naturalism – Theory in sociology
- States and Power in Africa – 2000 book by Jeffrey Herbst
- The Wealth and Poverty of Nations – 1998 book by David Landes
- Guns, Germs, and Steel – 1997 book by Jared Diamond
- William Easterly – American development economist
- Jeffrey Herbst – American political scientist
- David Landes – American economist and historian
- Ross Levine – American economist (born 1960)
- Montesquieu – French jurist, historian, and political philosopher (1689–1755)
- James A. Robinson – British political scientist and economist (born 1960)
- Andrew Sluyter – American social scientist (born 1958)
- Marvin Harris – American anthropologist (1927–2001)
- Geopolitics – Study of geography's effects on politics
