= State-building =

Term in social sciences and humanities

State-building as a specific term in social sciences and humanities, refers to political and historical processes of creation, institutional consolidation, stabilization and sustainable development of states, from the earliest emergence of statehood up to the modern times. Within historical and political sciences, there are several theoretical approaches to complex questions related to the role of various contributing factors (geopolitical, economic, social, cultural, ethnic, religious, internal, external) in state-building processes.

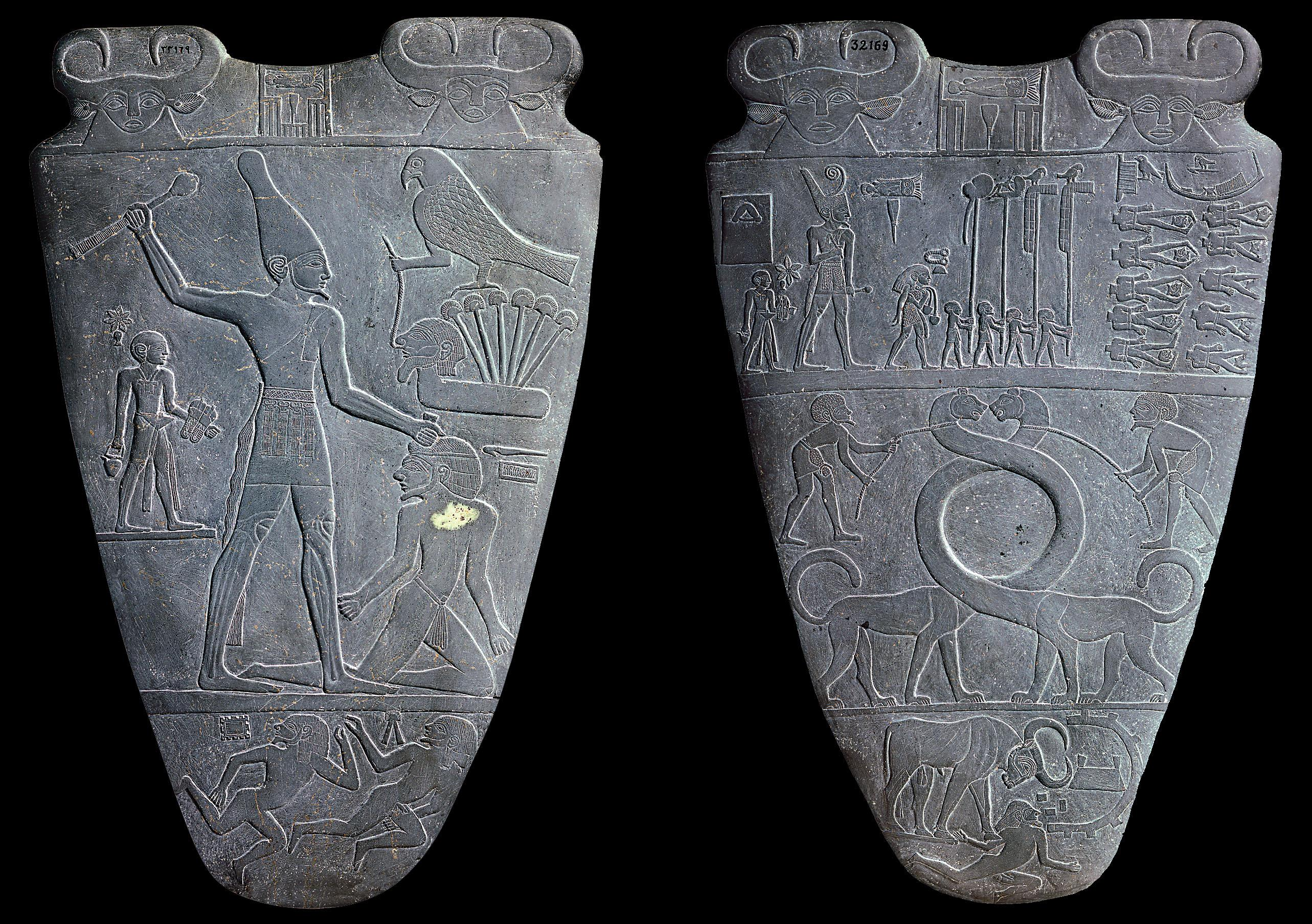
One of the earliest examples of state-building iconography: Two sides of the Narmer Palette (31st century BC) depicting pharaoh Narmer, wearing White Crown of Upper Egypt (recto), and Red Crown of Lower Egypt (verso), thus representing the unification of the land

Since the end of the 20th century, state-building has developed into becoming an integral part and even a specific approach to peacebuilding by the international community. Observers across the political and academic spectra have come to see the state-building approach as the preferred strategy to peacebuilding in a number of high-profile conflicts, including the Israeli–Palestinian conflict, and war-related conflicts in Bosnia and Herzegovina, Iraq, and Afghanistan.

The general argument in the academic literature on state-building is that without security, other tasks of state-building are not possible. Consequently, when state-building as an approach to peacebuilding is employed in conflict and post-conflict societies, the first priority is to create a safe environment in order to make wider political and economic development possible. So far, the results of using the state-building approach to peacebuilding have been mixed, and in many places, such as in the Balkans, Afghanistan and Iraq, the initial high expectations set by the international community have not been met. The literature on state-building has always been very clear that building states has historically been a violent process and the outcomes in the above-mentioned cases and many others confirm the destabilizing and often violent nature of state-building.

== Definition ==
State-building has been conceptualized in different ways.

A historical approach focuses on state-building processes, from the earliest emergence of statehood up to modern times. Historical science views state-building as a complex phenomenon, influenced by various contributing factors (geopolitical, economic, social, cultural, ethnic, religious) and analyzes those factors and their mutual relations from the perspective of a particular historical situation, that is characteristic of every state-building process.

A second approach conceptualizes state-building as an activity undertaken by external actors (foreign countries) attempting to build, or re-build, the institutions of a weaker, post-conflict or failing state.

A third approach conceptualizes state-building as development.

== Application of state-building theories ==
=== The predatory theory ===
When studying the development of European states, Charles Tilly identified that European countries engaged in four activities:

1. War making – eliminating or neutralizing their own rivals
2. State making – eliminating or neutralizing their rivals inside their own territory
3. Protection – eliminating or neutralizing the enemies of their clients
4. Extraction – acquiring the means of carrying out the first three activities.
5. Adjudication – authoritative settlement of disputes among members of the population
6. Distribution – intervention in the allocation of goods among the members of the population
7. Production – control of the creation and transformation of goods and services produced by the population

For Tilly, these activities are interdependent and rely on the state's ability to monopolize violence. Before the consolidation of European states, kings relied on their lords’ troops to emerge victorious from war, setting the final boundaries of their territories after years of campaigns. Still, these lords and their private armies could become potential threats to the king's power during peacetime. Originally, structures were created to facilitate extraction from the king's subordinates in exchange for protection (from their enemies and from the state), covering the expenses of war campaigns. However, extraction also economically strengthened the states, allowing them to expand their hold over the use of violence.

Out of these four activities, war making was the main stimulus to increasing the level of taxation, thus increasing the capacity of the state to extract resources otherwise known as fiscal capacity. The increased capacity of the state to extract taxes from its citizens while facing external threats prompted Jeffrey Herbst to propose allowing failed states to dissolve or engage in war to re-create the process endured by European countries. The process of extraction in exchange for protection was further argued by economic historian Frederic Lane. Lane argued that "governments are in the business of selling protection... whether people want it or not". Furthermore, Lane argued that a monopoly was best equipped to produce and control violence. This, he argued, was due to the fact that competition within a monopoly raised costs, and that producing violence renders larger economies of scale. Although the logic was consistent with the predatory theory of the state in early modern Europe, Herbst's point of view was criticized by several scholars including Richard Joseph who were concerned that the application of the predatory theory was an excessive approach to Darwinism. Many have disregarded the limited view of this theory and have instead extended it to include strong external threats of any kind. External threats to the state produce stronger institutional capacities to extract resources from the state.

More recent research has shown the importance not just of war but also of war outcomes, with state building consolidating in victorious but not defeated states.

==== Limited access orders ====
In their paper, Douglass North, John Wallis, and Barry Weingast offer an alternative framework - limited access orders - for understanding the predatory role of the state. In limited access orders, entry is restricted in both economic and political systems to produce rents that benefit the ruling elites. In open access orders, entry is open to all. The logic of the open access state is based on impersonality. Both systems are interdependent and are only stable when both have similar access frameworks, either limited or open. Transitioning from a limited access order to an open access order involves difficult, radical changes based on three "doorstep conditions": 1) rule of law for elites, 2) perpetual life for organizations, and 3) political control of the military. Once all three initial conditions are satisfied, more incremental changes can be made to move the state further in the direction of an open access order.

=== External lending ===
According to Didac Queralt, cheap access to credit in the 19th century inhibited state building, as the access to external loans made it unnecessary for rulers to undertake domestic political reforms to enhance internal resource extraction.

=== Social changes and social order ===
In his study on countries of Asia, Africa and Latin America, Joel Migdal presented the necessary and sufficient conditions for establishing a strong state. He considered "massive societal dislocation" that weakens old social control and institutions as the necessary condition. Such cases include the Black Death and the Hundred Years' War in Europe, the expansion of world economy into Asia, Africa and Latin America in the 19th century, the combination of war and revolution in China, Korea and Vietnam and mass migration in Taiwan and Israel in the 20th century. Furthermore, he listed the sufficient conditions as follows:

- World historical timing when exogenous political forces were in favor of concentrated social control;
- Existence of military threat from outside or other groups in the country;
- A group of skillful and independent people to build an independent bureaucracy;
- Skillful top leadership that would take advantage of the above conditions.

== Differentiating nation-building, military intervention and regime change ==
Some commentators have used the term nation-building interchangeably with state-building (e.g., RAND report on America's role in nation-building). However, in both major schools of theory, the state is the focus of thinking rather than the "nation" – the latter conventionally referring to the population itself, as united by identity history, culture and language. The issues debated related to the structures of the state (and its relationship to society) and as a result, state-building is the more broadly accepted term. In political science, nation-building usually has a quite distinct meaning, defined as the process of encouraging a sense of national identity within a given group of people, a definition that relates more to socialisation than state capacity (see the ODI, OECD, and DFID reports cited above).

Similarly, state-building (nation-building) has at times been conflated with military invasions that aim at regime change. This derives in part from the military invasions by Germany and Japan in World War II and resulting states and became especially prevalent following the October 2001 United States invasion of Afghanistan and March 2003 invasion of Iraq. The conflation of these two concepts has been highly controversial and has been used by opposing ideological and political forces to attempt to justify or reject as an illegal military occupation the invasions of Iraq and Afghanistan. Hence, regime change by outside intervention should be differentiated from state-building.

There have been some examples of military interventions by international or multilateral actors with a focus on building state capacity, including Bosnia and Herzegovina (1992–1995), East Timor, and Sierra Leone. Such interventions are alternatively described as "neotrusteeship" or "neoimperialism". Under this framework, strong states take over part of all of the governance of territories with underdeveloped existing governing structures, often with the backing of international legal authority. Unlike the classic imperialism of the 19th and early 20th centuries, this type of intervention is aimed at (re)building local state structures and turning over governance to them as quickly as possible. Such efforts vary in the scope of their objectives, however, with some believing that sweeping change can be accomplished through the sufficient and intelligent application of personnel, money, and time, while others believe that any such plans will founder on the inherent unpredictability of interventions and that lengthy, sustained interventions often prevent local leaders from taking responsibility and strengthen insurgent forces.

Neotrusteeship, shared sovereignty and other new models of intervention rest on the assumptions that intervention is the most effective strategy for state-building and that countries cannot recover from the failures of government without external interference. However, Jeremy M. Weinstein proposes autonomous recovery exists as a process that offers "lasting peace, a systematic reduction in violence, and post-war political and economic development in the absence of international intervention." The argument suggests that external interference detracts from the state-building by-products produced from war or military victories, given that military intervention makes rebel victories less likely and that peace-building discourages violence. External support undermines the creation of a self-sustaining relationship between rulers or political leaders and their constituents. Foreign aid promotes governments that maintain the same leaders in power and discourages developing a revenue extraction plan that would bind local politicians and local populations. War or military victories create conditions for self-sustaining and representative institutional arrangements through the domestic legitimacy and capacity of state revenue extraction that are by-products of war.

== Versus peace-building ==
State-building does not automatically guarantee peace-building, a term denoting actions that identify and support structures that strengthen and solidify peace in order to prevent a relapse into conflict. Whilst they have traditionally been considered two individual concepts with a complex relationship giving rise to dilemmas and necessitating trade-offs, as Grävingholt, Gänzle and Ziaja argue, the two actually representative two diverging perspectives on the same issue: a shaky social peace and a breakdown of political order. Whilst the OECD emphasises that peace-building and state-building are not the same, it does recognise the nexus between them and the reinforcement of one component has on the other: 'peace-building is primarily associated with post-conflict environments, and state-building is likely to be a central element of it in order to institutionalise peace'. Paris' model including the peace-building and state-building is one of the better-known ones. He advocates an Internationalisation Before Liberalisation (IBL) approach, arguing that peace-building must be geared towards building liberal and effective states, thus 'avoiding the pathologies of liberalization, while placing war-shattered states on a long-term path to democracy and market-oriented economics'.

Despite the advantages of incorporating peace-building and state-building in the same model, applicational limitations should be recognised. In practice, foreign and security policymaking still largely treat them as separate issues. Moreover, academics often approach the subjects from different angles. Heathershaw and Lambach caution that in practice, interventions that attempt the ambitious goals that Paris (amongst others) sets out may be coercive and driven by a 'the end justifies the means' outlook. This concern is acute in United Nations peacekeeping missions for there have been instances where peace-builders aspire not only to go a step further and eradicate the causes of violence, which are oftentimes not agreed upon by the parties to the conflict, but also to invest 'post-conflict societies with various qualities, including democracy in order to reduce the tendency toward arbitrary power and give voice to all segments of society; the rule of law in order to reduce human rights violations; a market economy free from corruption in order to discourage individuals from believing that the surest path to fortune is by capturing the state; conflict management tools; and a culture of tolerance and respect'. Such ambitious goals are questionable when the United Nations has been seen to struggle in high-profile conflict-ridden situations such as Darfur and the Democratic Republic of the Congo. Where it has accomplished a degree of stability such as in Haiti and Liberia, it endures pressure 'to transition from heavy and costly security-oriented peacekeeping operations to lighter, peace-building-oriented missions'. Introducing state-building to mandates is controversial not only because this would entail extra costs and commitments but also because 'the expansion of peacekeeping into these areas has de facto extended the authority of the Security Council, with political, financial, institutional, and bureaucratic implications that have yet to be fully addressed'.

Due to the inherently political nature of state building, interventions to build the state can hinder peace, increasing group tensions and sparking off further conflict. The strength of the consensus that has emerged stressing that 'a minimally functioning state is essential to maintain peace', ignores the complications that poor legitimacy and inclusion can lead to in the future, undermining the whole process. For instance, while the Guatemala Peace Accords were considered successful, 'the formal substance of these agreements has not altered power structures that have been in place for decades (if not centuries) in any substantial manner. The underlying (informal) understanding among elites – that their privileges and hold on power are not to be touched – appears to remain. Therefore, while the Accords may be deemed successful because they prevented the outbreak of war, this 'success' was tainted by the implications made by a subsequent report published by the Commission of Historical Clarification in February 1999. Its particular institutions were singled out as responsible for extensive human rights abuses. State institutions were assigned responsibility for 93% of these, and the guerrilla forces for 3%. In unexpectedly strong language, the report described Guatemalan governmental policy at the height of the war as a policy of genocide. The reinforcement of these state institutions as part of the peace-building process taints it by association.

Efforts to "appease" or 'buy off' certain interest groups in the interest of peace may undermine state-building exercises, as may power-sharing exercises that could favor the establishment of a political settlement over effective state institutions. Such political settlements could also enshrine power and authority with certain factions within the military, allowing them to carve up state resources to the detriment of state-building exercises. However, in weak states where the government has not sufficient power to control peripheries of the territory, alliances with the elites could strengthen the state's governing power. Yet, these alliances are successful if the agreement is mutually beneficial for the parties e.g. elites' power is threatened by competition and the entitlement of the government would help them to diminish it. In return, the government would acquire information and control over the peripheries' policies. Afghanistan since 2001, is an example of a beneficial pact between government and elites; entitling some select set of warlords as governors yielded a strongman brand of governance in two key provinces.

Sometimes peace-building efforts bypass the state in an effort to bring peace and development more quickly, for example, it was found that many NGOs in the Democratic Republic of Congo were building schools without involving the state. The state also may be part of the problem and over-reliance on the state by international actors can worsen security inside the country.

Conversely, state corruption can mean that state-building efforts serve only one ethnic, religious or other minority group, exacerbating tensions that could escalate toward violence. State building can also assist predatory states to strengthen their institutions, reinforcing abusive authority and further fueling grievances and popular resistance.

In practice, however, there remains confusion over the differences between state-building and peace-building. The UN's High-Level Panel on Threats, Challenges and Change stated that "along with establishing security, the core task of peace-building is to build effective public institutions that, through negotiations with civil society, can establish a consensual framework for governance with the rule of law". Additionally, a 2004 UN study found that a number of UN officials felt that the establishment of effective and legitimate state institutions was a key indicator of a successful peace operation.

== State capacity ==
State capacity is the ability of a government to accomplish policy goals, either generally or in reference to specific aims. A state that lacks capacity is defined as a fragile state or, in a more extreme case, a failed state. Higher state capacity has been strongly linked to long-term economic development, as state capacity can establish law and order, private property rights, and external defense, as well as support development by establishing a competitive market, transportation infrastructure, and mass education.

There are various definitions of state capacity among scholars. Economic historians Noel Johnson and Mark Koyama define state capacity as "the ability of a state to collect taxes, enforce law and order, and provide public goods." Berwick and Christia consolidate the literature on state capacity into 3 different domains:

- Extractive capacity is the process of collecting rents in order to provide resources for the governed. Taxing is the most common form of extraction. Tilly argues that state-building was not intended, but once it has begun, extraction capacity was necessary. Furthermore, Herbst argues that war is a catalyst to start or increase extractive capacity.
- Governmental capacity is the ability of lower-level governmental workers to implement the agenda of the higher level of government.
- Regulatory–productive capacity is the capacity of the state to provide output for the citizens. This output can include the enforcement of laws and the setting of policies for the citizens.

State capacity is widely cited as an essential element to why some countries are rich and others are not: "It has been established that the richest countries in the world are characterized by long-lasting and centralized political institutions"; "that poverty is particularly widespread and intractable in countries that lack a history of centralized government... and are internally fragmented"; "and countries with weak state capacity are particularly vulnerable to civil war and internal conflict".

Pritchett, Woolcock & Andrews (2013)^{[36]} offer a criticism of why state-building fails to work. They claim that many countries are in a capability trap – countries are, at most, converging at a very low pace to the same levels of state capacity. They estimate that on average, it would take 672 years for the bottom 15 countries to reach the state capability level of the best performer if their capabilities keep growing at the same average rate with which they have grown since their political independence. (Note: They use three index to estimate state capability: i) ‘government effectiveness’ from the World Bank World Governance Indicators, ii) resource efficiency, from the Bertelsmann Transformation Index, and iii) ‘progressive deterioration in public services’ from the Failed State Index.) Other indexes suggest that countries are not catching up: the bureaucratic quality and corruption index from the International Country Risk Guide (ICRG) has a negative pace of growth for the bottom 30 countries. The authors argue that the capability trap shows that external assistance to increase state capacity has not been successful in accelerating the development process. They identify that this implementation failure may occur through two techniques: i) systemic isomorphic mimicry, by which the structures of institutions are imitated (specific rules are followed) but they do not serve purposes functional to the society; and ii) premature load-bearing, in which the pressure exerted by outsiders undermines the organic evolution of local institutions.

== Approaches ==
While many specific techniques exist for creating a successful state-building strategy, three specific approaches have been identified by the recent 2010 UNRISD report. These three approaches would all fall under the endogenous school of thinking, and are: Good Governance, New Public Management, and Decentralization.

=== Education as a state-building tool ===
Education is used in both democratic and authoritarian contexts to promote state-building. In both democratic and authoritarian contexts, education seeks to promote social order and political stability by teaching citizens to respect the state's authority from a young age. Governments often turn to primary education to teach a common culture, political values and beliefs, and political behaviors. Education can also improve human capital and encourage economic growth; however, the correlation between access to education and the level of skills of the population is weak. While some suggest that education has a destabilizing effect on authoritarian states, and therefore authoritarian states will refrain from providing it, the historical record shows that authoritarian governments frequently expanded education provision rather than reduced it.

=== Good governance ===
Good governance is a very broadly used term for successful ways a government can create public institutions that protect people's rights. There has been a shift in good governance ideals, and as Kahn states, "The dominant 'good governance' paradigm identifies a series of capabilities that, it argues are necessary governance capabilities for a market-friendly state. These include, in particular, the capabilities to protect stable property rights, enforce the rule of law, effectively implement anti-corruption policies and achieve government accountability." This good governance paradigm is a market-enhancing process that emerged in the 1990s. This approach involves enforcing the rule of law, creating stronger property rights, and reducing corruption. By focusing on improving these three traits, a country can improve its market efficiency. There is a theoretical cycle of market failure which explains how a lack of property rights and strong corruption, among other problems, leads to market failure:

- The cycle starts with economic stagnation, which can enhance and expose the inefficiencies of a weak government and rule of law that cannot effectively respond to the problem.
- Because a government is unaccountable or weak, small interest groups can use the government for their specific interests, resulting in rent-seeking and corruption.
- Corruption and rent-seeking from interest groups will lead to weak property rights that prevent citizens and smaller businesses from the assurance that their property is safe under national law. Also, corruption will result in welfare-reducing interventions.
- These weak property rights and welfare-reducing interventions lead to high transaction cost markets.
- High transaction cost markets lead back to economic stagnation.

While it is understood that improving rule of law and reducing corruption are important methods for increasing the stability and legitimacy of a government, it is not certain whether this approach is a good basis for a state-building approach. Researchers have looked at this approach by measuring property rights, regulatory quality, corruption, and voice and accountability. There was little correlation found between increasing property rights and growth rates per capita GDP. Similarly, there is disagreement among development researchers as to whether it is more beneficial to promote a comprehensive set of reforms or to promote a minimal set of necessary reforms in contexts of poor institutionalization. Proponents of the latter approach have put forward the concept of "good enough governance".

=== New Public Management ===
In response to the unsuccessful attempts to strengthen government administrations, developing countries began to adopt market-oriented managerial reforms under the pressure of the IMF and the World Bank. The New Public Management approach first emerged in New Zealand and the United Kingdom in the 1980s. New Public management uses market-like reforms within the public sector to provide the government with the necessary power to implement a development plan for the economy while also using competitive market-based techniques to enhance public sector production. It changed public sector employment practices from career tenure positions towards limited-term contracts for senior staff, locally determined pay, and performance-related pay. Secondly, the provision of government services shifted towards contracts, franchising, vouchers, and user charges in an effort to promote efficiency in service provision to citizens.

In this type of government, large bureaucracies within a ministry (the principal) no longer maintain their hierarchical structure but rather are composed of operational arms of ministries that perform the role of an individual agent. The strategy has been more prominent in liberal market-driven policy regimes like New Zealand, the United Kingdom, and the United States. Continental Europe has been more resistant to implementing this type of policy. In developing countries, the implementation of these types of infrastructure has been difficult because the markets for the delivery of services are imperfect and increase the danger of regulatory capture by companies. For successful implementation, governments must have the infrastructure to measure reliable performance indicators and the capacity to regulate the behavior of private providers.

=== Decentralization ===
In reference to state-building approaches decentralization is beneficial because "It seeks to reduce rent-seeking behavior and inefficient resource allocation associated with centralized power by dispersing such power to lower levels of government, where the poor are likely to exercise influence and a variety of actors may participate in the provision of services".

Limitations to decentralization are the reduction of the meritocratic basis can limit the state's capacity to serve citizens, limited control of the fiscal funds at the local level can prevent effectiveness and substantial inequalities in fiscal capacity among different regions can create an ineffective redistribution of resources. Therefore, for these policies to work, there must be coordination efforts to ensure that growth-oriented and redistributive strategies initiated by the central government are implemented regionally. Furthermore, government elites must be in favor of low-income groups and grass root groups should be able to engage with local authorities during policy making.

== Examples of state-building ==
European states replicated or bequeathed their institutions in the territories they colonized, but many new emerging states have evolved differently. European states consolidated after long years of internal and external struggles that greatly differ in context from the struggles of some recently emerged states.

=== Regime type ===
Governments that have implemented the top-down method present the idea that there is a great external threat that can diminish the capabilities of a state and its citizens. The perceived threat creates an incentive that focuses policy, makes elites cooperate, and facilitates the adoption of a nationalistic ideology. In an authoritarian government, political, military, and ideological power is concentrated to be conducive to policy continuation. The bureaucracies implemented are well-trained, well-paid and highly competitive in recruitment and promotion. Economically successful states in East Asia have taken on programs to create infrastructure, subsidize the farming sector, provide credit, support spending on targeted research, and invest in health and education. However, most governments are non-developmental and unstable. Furthermore, even when countries have tried to pursue authoritarian strategies that have worked, specifically Brazil, a divided military, regional oligarchs in power, and vast disparities in inequality delegitimized the regime. A democratic regime engages citizens more actively than a top-down government. It respects the right of citizens to contest policies. Successful democracies developed political capacities by nurturing active citizenship, maintaining electoral competitiveness that gave value to the votes of the poor, fostering political parties that were strongly oriented towards equality and having strong party-social movement ties.

=== Latin America ===
Latin America experienced a period of rapid economic growth and political stability in the late-19th century, following independence and subsequent decades of decline caused by violence, reduced state capacity, and fiscal fragmentation. This trajectory is markedly successful relative to other post-conflict societies at the time. Latin Americans also enacted a number of liberal public policies swiftly and effectively, such as abolition of slavery (Saint-Domingue in 1793, Haiti in 1804, New Spain in 1813, Peru in 1854, Brazil in 1888), socializing property rights over land, and eliminating public monopolies, which fostered long-term stability that facilitated economic growth and established a new political economy for these new nations. The growth and stability seen in Latin America, however, did come at a high social cost in the form of social inequality that continued into the 21st century.

In the 21st century it became economically and politically difficult for Latin American countries to increase revenues, which led states to turn to debt for the necessary resources to pay for war. As a result, Latin American countries did not establish the same tax basis that their European counterparts did. This can be explained by the predatory theory. Studies on the extraction of tax revenues have demonstrated that both external and internal rivals affect the ability of a state to develop and extract resources from its citizens. Interstate rivals had a positive effect on the state's capacity to extract resources while intrastate rivals had a negative effect on state building.

=== Africa ===
Tilly's theory that external threats strengthen the state's capacity to extract taxes from its citizens can apply to developing countries in Africa. The presence of both external state rivals and internal ethnic rivals prompted states to increase their extraction of taxes from citizens while internal political rivals failed to affect the extraction of taxes. The leaders in power try to maintain their position by catering to the majority ethnic group and by increasing taxes to gain the resources to diminish threats from minority ethnic groups. Thus the presence of internal ethnic rivals creates the capacity to significantly increase the tax ratio.

Drawing on Charles Tilly's theory of European state formation, a number of scholars have suggested that in focusing on internal rivalries, rather than challenging colonial borders, rulers were "less likely to see their economies as a resource to be nurtured than as an object of periodic plunder—the analogy to Olson's (1993) roving bandits should be clear" (Thies, 2004: 58). In the absence of external threats, rulers thus had no impetus to replicate the patterns described by Tilly — war-making, coercion and resource extraction — that had proven crucial to the process of centralization of power in the states of Europe.

For example, in States and Power in Africa (2000), Jeffrey Herbst explains that "domestic security threats, of the type African countries face so often, may force the state to increase revenue; however, civil conflicts result in fragmentation and considerable hostility among different segments of the population", undermining the state's ability to rally the population's support for the "national project" (2000: 126). In a later article, Herbst argues that war in Europe led to strong states and that without war African states will remain weak. In Europe, external threats allowed states to tax, increase taxation, and forge a national identity. Additionally, the states that were invaded and taken over (such as Poland-Lithuania or Ireland) by stronger countries were militarily and politically weak. African states are poor, have weak governments, and are fragmented on ethnic or regional lines. According to theory, these weak African states should be susceptible to external threats, but this is not the case. In Africa, Herbst notes, there are rarely conflicts between states, and if there are, war does not threaten the existence of the state. For example, in the 1979 Uganda-Tanzania War, Tanzania invaded Uganda to overthrow Idi Amin, but after the Tanzanians had removed Amin, they left the country. Although African states do not experience widespread interstate war, Herbst argues they need it to reform the tax structure and to build a national identity. Herbst concludes that war in Africa is likely to occur when African leaders realize that their economic reforms and efforts to build a national identity do not work and in desperation will start wars to build the states that their countries need. James Robinson disagrees with Herbst in the grade of influence of war on state-building, stating that European colonization and European influences in the continent impacted more deeply the creation of institutions, and therefore, states in Africa.

As of 2017 the provision of public services, another dimension of state-building, which includes the management of human capital within the realm of service along with the delivery of public services, remains another major challenge for post-conflict African nations. Academics have built models of the political economy in post-conflict African societies to understand the trade-off between the capability, delivery, and stability of public-service administration, and policies that result in weak civil service rooted in the nations' legacies of conflict.

Several researchers have emphasized that the internal violence seen in Africa was characteristic of early modern European politics and that this type of structure may resolve to produce an increased level of political order. A number of scholars have criticized this claim for its "excessively Darwinian", overly deterministic and Euro-centric understanding of the process of state-formation (Thies, 2004: 69, see also Joseph, 1997).

=== Asia ===
==== Palestine ====
The Palestine Liberation Organization (PLO) claims sovereignty over the Palestinian Territories whose legal statehood is widely recognized (though not by some major global powers), as well as representative status over the Palestinian people, a claim that is universally recognized. However, it does not have sole jurisdiction over the areas it claims. In addition, many of those it aims to represent currently reside elsewhere, most notably in Arab countries such as Jordan, Lebanon, and Syria. Nonetheless, the PLO and other Palestinian organisations have historically made great efforts to install institutions of a type commonly associated with states in the Palestinian territories - as well as in countries with large numbers of Palestinian residents. Examples include:

- Jordan after the Six-Day War (June 1967), where the installation of parallel structures of power and mechanisms for taxation and education led to largely independent Palestinian enclaves which formed a threat to the power and legitimacy of the Hashemite monarchy
- Lebanon, where a similar process exacerbated ethnic and religious tensions

Despite the break-down of the Oslo process of 1993-2000 and the ongoing construction of Israeli settlements (1967 to present), the Palestinian National Authority continues to engage in state-building activities in its territories and has referred to the "State of Palestine" in official documents since 2013. In 2003 the United Nations Security Council passed UN Resolution 1515, calling for the "establishment of an independent, democratic and viable Palestinian state". Despite this official acknowledgement of the legitimacy of PNA state-building by the international community, a 2011 report prepared by the London-based Overseas Development Institute found international assistance to have been "sporadic and fragmented". Besides the lack of consistent outside support, the report identified key challenges to Palestinian state-building at the international level, including the lack of horizon on "final status" negotiations, failed peace negotiations, the tightening of the occupation, and the weak economic base, in addition to profound challenges at the domestic level, including:

- a lack of an internal political settlement
- weak linkages between ruling authorities and society at large
- weakened social cohesion
- gender inequality
- weak civil-society
- lack of capacity of formal PNA institutions
- (perceived) securitization of authority across the occupied Palestinian territory

A number of scholars have questioned whether the Palestinian Authority was ever in a position to build a viable state. Edward Said, Neve Gordon and Sara Roy – among others – have argued that the PNA was designed as an "occupation subcontractor", only strengthening the power asymmetries between occupier and occupied. Another strand of analysis, associated with Jamil Hilal and Mushtaq Khan (2004), portrays the PNA as a "transitional client quasi-state", stuck in a situation where core functions of the state remain in the hands of the Israeli state. They identify structural issues within the Oslo process and disunity and corruption prevalent among the Palestinian elite as key reasons for the failure of Palestinian state-building efforts.

==== Saudi Arabia ====
Based on kernels of tribalism, fundamentalist religious ideology (Wahhabist Islam) and monarchical dynastic control, Saudi Arabia formed as a 20th-century state with the support of tax revenues and military development.

== See also ==
- Constitutional economics
- Political economy
- Rule according to higher law
- Nation-building
- Regime change
- The White Man's Burden – a poem
- Disaster capitalism
- Political settlement
- Sovereign state
- State (polity)
- Environmental determinism
- States and Power in Africa – a book
- Peacekeeping
- Stabilization of fragile states

== Literature ==
- Almond, Gabriel: The Return to the State in: American Political Science Review, Vol. 82, No. 3, 853–874, 1988.
- Bachrach, Bernard S. (1995). State-building in Medieval France: Studies in Early Angevin History. Aldershot: Variorum.
- Bastian, S. and Luckham, R. ) In Can Democracy Be Designed? : The Politics of Institutional Choice in Conflict-Torn Societies (Ed, Luckham, R.) Zed, London Collier, P., 2003.
- Caplan, Richard, International Governance of War-torn Territories: Rule and Reconstruction, Oxford: OUP, 2005.
- Chandler, D. Empire in Denial: The Politics of State-building. Pluto Press, 2006.
- Chesterman, Simon: You, The People: The United Nations, Transitional Administration, and State-Building. Oxford University Press, 2004.
- Collier, Paul Breaking the Conflict Trap: Civil War and Development Policy OUP, Oxford, 2003.
- The Commission on Post-Conflict Reconstruction, Play to Win, Center for Strategic and International Studies and the Association of the U.S. Army, Washington DC, 2003.
- Covey, Dziedzic, et al. (eds.) The Quest for Viable Peace: International Intervention and Strategies for Conflict Transformation, USIP Press, Washington DC, 2005.
- Dahrendorf, N. (Ed.) A Review of Peace Operations: A Case for Change, King's College, London, 2003.
- Darden, Keith; Mylonas, Harris (2012). "The Promethean Dilemma: Third-Party State-building in Occupied Territories". Ethnopolitics. 1: 85–93. doi:10.1080/17449057.2011.596127. S2CID 145382064.
- Engin, Kenan. 2013, Nation-Building' - Theoretische Betrachtung und Fallbeispiel: Irak. (Dissertation), Nomos, Baden-Baden 2013, ISBN 9783848706846
- Fukuyama, Francis: State Building. Governance and World Order in the Twenty-First Century, Ithaca, N.Y.: Cornell University Press, 2004a, ISBN 0-8014-4292-3
- Fukuyama, Francis: The Imperative of State-Building, in: Journal of Democracy, Vol. 15, No. 2, 17–31, 2004b.
- Hilal, J., and Khan, M.H. State Formation under the PA:Potential Outcomes and their Viability. In M.H. Khan, G. Giacaman and I. Amundsen (eds.), State Formation in Palestine: Viability and Governance during a Social Transformation. Abingdon: Routledge, 2004.
- Hehir, A. and Robinson, N. (eds.) "State-building: Theory and Practice", Routledge, London, 2007.
- Joseph, R (1997). "Correspondence: Responding to State Failure in Africa". International Security. 22 (2): 175–181. doi:10.2307/2539373. JSTOR 2539373.
- Kjær, Anne M./Hansen, Ole H./Frølund Thomsen, Jens Peter: Conceptualizing State Capacity, Working Paper, March, Department of Political Science, University of Aarhus, 2002.
- Krasner, Stephen D (1984). "1984 Approaches to the State: Alternative Conceptions and Historical Dynamics". Comparative Politics. 16 (2): 223–246. doi:10.2307/421608. JSTOR 421608.
- Kuzio, Taras/Kravchuk, Robert S./D’Anieri, Paul (eds.): State and Institution Building in Ukraine, London: Routledge, 1998, ISBN 0-415-17195-4.
- Mazzuca, Sebastián L., Latecomer State Formation: Political Geography and Capacity Failure in Latin America. New Haven, CT: Yale University Press, 2021.
- Migdal, Joel S.: State in Society. Studying how States and Societies Transform and Constitute one another, Cambridge: Cambridge University Press, 2001.
- Nagl, Dominik. No Part of the Mother Country, but Distinct Dominions - Law, State-Building and Governance in England, Massachusetts und South Carolina, 1630-1769 (2013).
- Paris, Roland, A War's End, University of Colorado, Boulder, 2004.
- Parish, Matthew: A Free City in the Balkans: Reconstructing a Divided Society in Bosnia, London: I.B.Tauris, 2009.
- Persson, Anders (2012). "Building a state or maintaining the occupation? International support for Fayyad’s state-building project", Journal of Conflict Transformation and Security, Vol. 2, No. 1, pp: 101–119.
- Samuels, Kirsti S, State Building and the Consequences of Constitutional Choices in Conflictual Environments: Bosnia and Herzegovina, Fiji, Lebanon, Northern Ireland, South Africa and Uganda, IPA Policy Paper, New York, 2006.
- Skopcol, Theda: Bringing the State Back In, in: Social Science Research Items, Vol. 36, June 1–8, 1982.
- Tilly, Charles: Coercion, Capital, and European States, AD 900–1990, Malden: Blackwell, 2000, ISBN 1-55786-067-X.
- Tilly, Charles (ed.): Western-State Making and Theories of Political Transformation, in: The Formation of National States in Western Europe, Princeton: Princeton University Press, 1975.
- World Bank : World Development Report 1997: The State in a Changing World, Washington, DC: World Bank, 1997
- The U.S. Army. The U.S. Army Stability Operations Field Manual Ann Arbor, University of Michigan Press, 2009.
- Whaites, Alan: `States in Development: Understanding State-building,' UK Department for International Development, London, 2008 (States in Development paper).
- Zaum, Dominik: The Sovereignty Paradox: The Norms and Politics of International Statebuilding, Oxford: Oxford University Press, 2007.
