= Physioeconomics =

Research that collects physiological parameters in addition to recording behavior

Physioeconomics (or physio-economics) is an extension of experimental economics research that collects physiological parameters in addition to recording behavior. These measures can include skin conductance, blood pressure and the pulse of the subject. Experiments typically present subjects with economic decisions in a game–like context.

The term has also been used by Philip M. Parker in his book Physioeconomics to refer to his theory of the physiological basis of economics, according to which the equatorial paradox (that countries further from the equator have higher GDP per capita) is explained by the pressure on humans located in cold climates to restore their physiological homeostasis, for example by agriculture and wealth-creation.

The field of physioeconomics is interdisciplinary, drawing on concepts and methods from economics, physiology, psychology, and other disciplines. Its goal is to understand how the human body and mind respond to economic stimuli, and how these responses affect economic behavior. Physioeconomics has been used to study a wide range of topics, including consumer behavior, financial decision-making, work productivity, and stress. The field has also been applied to policy issues such as the design of work environments and the provision of health care. A number of different research methods are used in physioeconomics, including laboratory experiments, field studies, and surveys. The insights gained from physioeconomic research can be used to improve the well-being of individuals and society as a whole.

== Background ==
Traditional experimental economics places individuals in situations where they have to make decisions about questions that affect their real or theoretical pocketbooks. Such experiments are conducted in a controlled laboratory environment. The analysis of the experiments is limited to the evaluation of market outcomes and questionnaires. The survey provides only subjective impressions. Another issue is that questionnaire answers often follow social norms rather than revealing the subject's real view. Physiological parameters, such as skin conductance, provide additional, objective measurements that allow a deeper insight into the decision-making process.

Particularly in the study of markets and negotiations, understanding the behavior and motives of participants is necessary. Therefore, the influence of emotions on decisions and behavior is of great interest. Physiological measurements can help explain these elements. The methodology for physically measuring emotions is well–researched and provides an established means dar.

== Differentiation from related fields ==
The field of neuroeconomics examines brain activity in economic decision situations with methods of magnetic resonance imaging or electroencephalography, and so can be considered a subfield of physio-economics. As of 2011, these technologies are considerably more expensive than other techniques of physio-economics.

== Methodology ==
To ensure applicability and present a useful complement to experimental economics, the following conditions were placed on the measurement methodology:

1. Implement observations on multiple subjects should be implemented in a parallel environment of a normal PC-Pool.
2. Convenient equipment that does not require advanced training,
3. Subjects sit upright and maintain eye contact.
4. Employ unobtrusive measurements in a neutral environment.
5. Avoid measurements that cause unpleasant after-effects.

Physiological parameters that satisfy these conditions are particularly good, the electrodermal activity, heart rate and blood pressure. While the focus so Neuroeconomics with neural activities in economic decision situations that are in the research Economics exclusively for Physio-physiological parameters.

== Contemporary Research ==
The field of physio economics is still emerging, but there is already a growing body of research on the topic. Much of this research has focused on the role of climate in shaping economic activity and outcomes. For example, Boucsein (1988) provides a comprehensive overview of the use of electrodermal activity (EDA) in physioeconomics. EDA is a measure of the electrical conductivity of the skin, which increases in response to emotional arousal. Boucsein reviews the literature on the use of EDA in a variety of economic contexts, including risk taking, decision making under uncertainty, and consumer choice. He concludes that EDA can be a useful tool for understanding economic decisions, but that more research is needed to determine the predictive power of EDA measures.

Smith (1989) and Kagel and Roth (1995) provide a comprehensive overview of the use of experimental economics in research on economic decision making. They review studies on a variety of economic topics, including risk taking, decision making under uncertainty, and consumer choice. They conclude that experimental economics can be a valuable tool for understanding economic decisions, but that more research is needed to determine the predictive power of experimental methods.

Cacioppo et al. (2007) provide a comprehensive overview of the use of psychophysiological measures in research on economic decision making. They review studies on a variety of physiological measures, including heart rate, skin conductance, and facial expressions. They conclude that physiological measures can provide valuable insights into economic decision making, but that more research is needed to determine the predictive power of these measures.

Hagenau et al. (2007) provide a primer on physioeconomics. They review the literature on the use of physiological measures in economic research, with a focus on how these measures can be used to understand group decision making and negotiation. They conclude that physiological measures can be a valuable tool for understanding economic decisions, but that more research is needed to determine the predictive power of these measures.

Van de Vliert and Tol (2014) found that countries with harsher climates tend to have harsher governance, except in cases where the country is cold, dry, and wealthy. They argue that this is because harsh climates promote feelings of anxiety and insecurity, which lead to stricter social norms and more authoritarian governance. Other research has examined the link between climate and culture.

Van de Vliert (2016) argues that different cultures emerge in different climatic conditions due to the different ways that people adapt to their environment. He suggests that this can help explain why some cultures are more unequal than others. For example, cultures in colder climates tend to be more individualistic and competitive, while those in hotter climates are more collectivist and cooperative. This difference may be due to the fact that cooperation is more effective in hot climates where people are physically closer together, while competition is more effective in cold climates where people need to conserve energy. There is also a growing body of research on the link between physiology and economics.

Adam et al. (2008) found that emotions play a significant role in electronic auctions, with participants bidding more aggressively when they were feeling happy or angry. They suggest that these results have implications for our understanding of economic decision-making more generally. They also found evidence that physiological factors influence economic behavior, showing that people are more likely to take risks when they are hungry or thirsty.

== Criticisms ==
Physioeconomics has been criticized on a number of grounds. First, it is accused of being reductionist, as it attempts to explain all economic activity in terms of physiology. Second, it is accused of being deterministic, as it implies that economic activity is predetermined by physiological factors. Third, it has been criticized for its lack of empirical evidence. Finally, it has been criticized for its lack of a clear theoretical framework.
