= Jeffrey Herbst =

American political scientist

4th President of American Jewish University
- In office July 1, 2018 – May 5, 2025
- Preceded by: Robert Wexler

16th President of Colgate University
- In office July 1, 2010 – June 30, 2015
- Preceded by: Rebecca Chopp
- Succeeded by: Brian Casey

Personal details
- Born: March 24, 1961 (age 65) Queens, New York, U.S.
- Spouse: Sharon Polansky
- Children: 3
- Education: Princeton University (BA); Yale University (MA, MPhil, PhD)

Jeffrey I. Herbst is an American political scientist, specializing in comparative politics, and was the fourth president of the American Jewish University in Los Angeles, California from July 2018 to May 2025. Herbst was previously the 16th president of Colgate University, and president and CEO of the Newseum in Washington, D.C. He resigned from his post at the Newseum in 2017 as the museum announced financial issues. Prior to assuming the presidency of Colgate in 2010, he was provost, executive vice president for academic affairs, and professor of political science at Miami University. He received his B.A. from Princeton University in 1983, M.A., MPhil from Yale University in 1985, and Ph.D. in 1987 also from Yale. He is married to Sharon Polansky, with whom he has three children.

Herbst has written extensively on political and international affairs in Africa. He is the author of State Politics in Zimbabwe (Perspectives on Southern Africa) and States and Power in Africa: Comparative Lessons in Authority and Control (Princeton University Press, 2000), which received the 2001 Luebbert Best Book Award in comparative politics for the year 2000 from the American Political Science Association. It was also a finalist for the 2001 Melville J. Herskovits Award for the best book in African studies awarded by the African Studies Association.

Herbst has two siblings, his sister Susan Herbst who was the President of the University of Connecticut, and his brother Steve Herbst, who is Vice President of broadcasting and global media strategy for NASCAR.

== See also ==
- States and Power in Africa: Comparative Lessons in Authority and Control
- Environmental determinism
- State building
- Impact of Western European colonialism and colonisation
