= States and Power in Africa =

2000 book by Jeffrey Herbst

- Author: Jeffrey Herbst
- Language: English
- Subject: State-building, Postcolonialism, Environmental determinism, Comparative politics, International relations,
- Published: 2000 (Princeton University Press)
- Publication place: United States
- Media type: Hardcover, Paperback
- Pages: 280 pages (paperback)
- ISBN: 0-691-01028-5 (paperback)
- LC Class: JQ1875.H47 2000

States and Power in Africa: Comparative Lessons in Authority and Control is a book on African state-building by Jeffrey Herbst, former Professor of Politics and International Affairs at the Princeton School of Public and International Affairs. The book was a co-winner of the 2001 Gregory Luebbert Book Award from the American Political Science Association in comparative politics. It was also a finalist for the 2001 Herskovits Prize awarded by the African Studies Association.

This book attempts to explain the lack of robust institutions and the prevalence of state failure in Africa. The work is heavily influenced by the scholarship of Charles Tilly and Max Weber. Both writers emphasize the role of war in the consolidation of state power over well-defined territories.

== Overview ==
At the time of writing, Herbst argued that the political science literature had largely ignored the African state-building experience and focused instead on state creation in Western Europe. His book is an attempt to understand the long run processes of state-building in Africa.

In Europe, social scientists such as Charles Tilly have argued that European states consolidated power to survive in an anarchic international system during the fourteenth and fifteenth centuries. Faced with the constant threat of war, European political elites sent administrators and armed forces from the urban centers into rural hinterlands to raise taxes, recruit soldiers, and fortify buffer zones. Elites reduced the role of rural authorities and favored direct political rule. European states consequently developed strong political and economic linkages between cities and surrounding territories.

Herbst emphasizes that the international pressures for war-making that existed in medieval Europe never existed in many parts of Africa. The European state-building experience was unusual and exceptional because it occurred under systemic geographic pressures that favored state consolidation – namely, scarcity of land and high-population densities. By contrast, Herbst argues, Africa has for most of its history been a relatively sparsely populated continent. Precolonial African states never faced survival imperatives for the projection of state power over rural terrain.

During colonialism or after independence, moreover, European colonial powers had little incentive to develop state institutions to protect their colonies against invasion, having divided up Africa at the Berlin Conference. The colonizers instead focused on plundering natural resources through exploitation colonialism. The international state system enforced colonial boundaries of African states following independence, eroding any possible survival mandate.

Herbst argues that African states have therefore survived without developing the robust and responsive physical, economic, and political infrastructure of modern European states.

Herbst underscores that theorizing African state-building is necessary for a nuanced understanding of international relations because states in many other regions, including Central America, South America, and Southeast Asia face the same challenges that African states confront when controlling and policing their territories.

== Synopsis ==
=== Influence of geography on pre-colonial African states ===
Herbst argues that geographic features influenced how precolonial African states conceived of meaningful power.

States did not seek to exert total control over strictly delineated territory. Herbst writes, "To equate states with firm territorial control is to misread even much of Europe's own history." Rather, in precolonial Africa and medieval Europe, multiple powers extracted tribute and resources from the same territory. Villages appeased the multiple powers that could launch attacks against them by offering treasure and tribute, often in the form of slaves.

Geographic features encouraged this shared distribution of power. African farmers relied on rain-fed agriculture and consequently invested little in particular pieces of land. Because land was sparsely populated, African farmers could easily flee rulers rather than fight. Establishing absolute control over particular pieces of land was prohibitively costly and consequently a low priority for African elites.

Varied and harsh terrain made it difficult for precolonial leaders to continuously exert power from political centers to the hinterlands. Some empires, like the Ashanti Empire, successfully projected power over large distances by building roads. The largest precolonial polities arose in the Sudanian Savanna belt of West Africa because the horses and camels could transport armies over the terrain. In other areas, no centralized political organizations existed above the village level.

Because polities did not pretend to control areas that they could not physically reach, shared sovereignty became the norm in precolonial Africa. International and domestic affairs were then less differentiated than in the modern Peace of Westphalia state system.

== Publication ==
States and Power in Africa was first published in 2000 by Princeton University Press. It is part of the Princeton Studies in International History and Politics book series, edited by John Ikenberry, Marc Trachtenberg, and William Wohlforth. Princeton University Press released a second paperback edition with a new preface written by Herbst in 2014. A new hardcover edition was released in 2015.

== Academic reception ==
States and Power in Africa was a co-winner of the 2001 Gregory Luebbert Book Award from the American Political Science Association in comparative politics. It was also a finalist for the 2001 Herskovits Prize awarded by the African Studies Association.

In a 2002 book review for the Journal of Economic Literature, James A. Robinson called the book "a bold, historically informed theoretical analysis, essential reading for economists interested in comparative institutions and development". Robinson offers several critiques of the book. He questions that low population densities stalled modern institutional development in Africa, arguing that states with higher precolonial population densities were worse off after colonialism on average. He also contests Herbst's conclusion that modern powers should allow the disintegration of the African states to promote experimentation with new forms of sovereignty.

== See also ==
- Colonialism
- Colonisation of Africa
- Decolonisation of Africa
- Environmental determinism
- Impact of Western European colonialism and colonisation
- State-building
- Why Nations Fail
