= Ross Levine =

American economist (born 1960)

- Born: April 16, 1960 (age 66); New York, NY

Academic background
- Education: Cornell University (B.A. 1982); UCLA (Ph.D. 1987)

Academic work
- Discipline: Financial economics, Economic development
- Institutions: University of California at Berkeley
- Website: Information at IDEAS / RePEc

Ross Levine (born April 16, 1960) is an American economist who currently holds the Willis H. Booth Chair in Banking and Finance at the University of California at Berkeley. He is also a senior fellow at the Milken Institute, a member of the Council on Foreign Relations, and an advisor to the World Economic Forum. As of 2018, he is the 12th most cited economist in the world.

== Education ==
He received his B.A. in economics from Cornell University in 1982, graduating Phi Beta Kappa. He completed his Ph.D. at UCLA in 1987.

== Career ==
Upon completion of his doctorate, he began work as an economist for the Board of Governors of the Federal Reserve System. From 1990 to 1997, he was a principal economist at The World Bank.

He became an associate professor at the University of Virginia in 1997 and was granted tenure two years later. From 1999 to 2005, he was the Curtis L. Carlson Professor of Finance at the University of Minnesota.

In 2005, he was hired by the department of economics at Brown University, where he taught an undergraduate course on financial institutions and an advanced seminar on financial regulation. At Brown, he was also the founding director of the William R. Rhodes Center for International Economics and the James and Merryl Tisch Professor of Economics.

In February 2010, he debated the merits of financial innovation with Joseph Stiglitz, the 2001 recipient of the Nobel Prize in Economics, in an online series for The Economist.

He was hired by Berkeley in 2012 and remains an advisor to the World Bank, Federal Reserve System, and the International Monetary Fund.

== Research ==
Levine specializes in international finance, banking regulation, and economic development. Specifically, his research focuses on the links between financial intermediaries and economic growth. He has also examined bank supervision and corruption.

He has written extensively on the 2008 financial crisis. In April 2010, he published An Autopsy of the U.S. Financial System, which investigated the causes of the crisis. He found that while financial institutions played a major role in the system's collapse, regulatory policies during the period from 1996 to 2006 also contributed to the crisis. He likens the government's role to negligent homicide.

The evidence indicates that senior policymakers repeatedly designed, implemented, and maintained policies that destabilized the global financial system in the decade before the crisis. The policies incentivized financial institutions to engage in activities that generated enormous short-run profits but dramatically increased long-run fragility. Moreover, the evidence suggests that the regulatory agencies were aware of the consequences of their policies and yet chose not to modify those policies.

== Books ==
- Guardians of Finance: Making Them Work for Us, (with James Barth and Gerard Caprio), MIT Press, 2012.
- Rethinking Bank Supervision and Regulation: Until Angels Govern, (with James Barth and Gerard Caprio), Cambridge University Press, 2006.
- Financial Structure and Economic Growth: A Cross-Country Comparison of Banks, Markets, and Development, (with Asli Demirguc-Kunt). MIT Press, 2001.

== See also ==
- 2008 financial crisis
- Banking regulation
- Economic development
- Environmental determinism
- Financial innovation
