= Stanley Engerman =

American economist (1936–2023)

- Born: March 14, 1936; New York City, U.S.
- Died: May 11, 2023 (aged 87); Watertown, Massachusetts, U.S.
- Education: New York University (BS, MS); Johns Hopkins University (PhD)
- Spouse: Judith Rader
- Children: 3
- Awards: Bancroft Prize (1975)
- Scientific career
- Fields: Economics, Economic history
- Workplaces: University of Rochester

Stanley Lewis Engerman (March 14, 1936 – May 11, 2023) was an American economist and economic historian. He was known for his quantitative historical work along with Nobel Prize-winning economist Robert Fogel. His first major book, co-authored with Robert Fogel in 1974, was Time on the Cross: The Economics of American Negro Slavery. This significant work, winner of the Bancroft Prize in American history, challenged readers to think critically about the economics of slavery. Engerman has also published over 100 articles and has authored, co-authored or edited 16 book-length studies.

Engerman served as president of the Social Science History Association as well as president of the Economic History Association. He was professor of Economics and Professor of History at the University of Rochester, where he taught classes in economic history and the economics of sports and entertainment. From 2009 to 2012 he was a visiting professor in the Harvard University Economics Department, where he taught the economics of sports and entertainment.

Engerman's students included Evelyn Brooks Higginbotham, David Eltis, Gary Gorton, Art Laffer, Jeremy Lin, and Robert L. Paquette.

== Early life and education ==
Engerman was born in Brooklyn in 1936. His father, Irving Engerman, was a wholesale furniture salesman while his mother, Edith (Kaplan) Engerman, was a homemaker. He received his bachelor's and master's degrees in accounting from New York University in 1956 and 1958 before earning a PhD in economics in 1962 from Johns Hopkins University.

== Academic career ==
After completing his PhD, he taught at Yale University for a year. He started working at the University of Rochester in 1963 where he was a professor of economics until his retirement in 2017.

=== Time on the Cross ===
The critical reception of Engerman's most widely read work, Time on the Cross: The Economics of American Negro Slavery (co-authored with Robert Fogel) was unique in its public visibility. Reminiscent of Charles A. Beard's economic analysis of the Constitution in its longevity, Time on the Cross made a variety of politically charged claims based on cliometric quantitative methods. Fogel and Engerman claimed that slavery remained an economically viable institution and slave ownership was generally a profitable investment, slave agriculture was very efficient, and the material conditions of the lives of slaves "compared favorably with those of free industrial workers."

Charles Crowe offered a summary of the work: "The cliometricians announced the scientific discovery of a vastly different South led by confident and effective slaveowning entrepreneurs firmly wedded to handsome profits from a booming economy with high per capita incomes and an efficiency ratio 35 per- cent greater than that of free Northern agriculture. In the new dispensation the efficient, often highly skilled, and very productive slaves embraced the Protestant work ethic and prudish Victorian morals, avoided both promiscuity and substantial sexual exploitation by planters, lived in father-headed and stable nuclear families, kept 90 percent of the fruits of their labor, and enjoyed one of the best sets of material conditions in the world for working class people."

The book was controversial, with critics saying that it presented a "relatively benign" depiction of slavery. According to The New York Times, a panel about the book hosted by Engerman and Fogel at Rochester, and attended by about 100 academics, turned so contentious that it the local press termed it "scholarly warfare".

In a 1989 edition of the book, Engerman and Fogel acknowledge that they could have done more to emphasize the evils of slavery.

=== Research with Kenneth L. Sokoloff ===
Engerman co-authored an article entitled "History Lessons: Institutions, Factor Endowments, and Paths of Development in the New World" with Kenneth Sokoloff, which can be found in The Journal of Economic Perspectives. Sokoloff and Engerman go in-depth and argue that the economic trajectory of former New World colonies over the past 300 years was largely determined by various facets of their natural environments. Sokoloff and Engerman focus mainly on the effects of the colonies' soil qualities. Sokoloff and Engerman claim that in areas such as Cuba which possessed land suitable for sugar and coffee, the soil quality led to economies of scale and plantation agriculture and slave labor. This in turn led to a guarded franchise, high tax rates, and limits on education. In areas such as the United States which possessed land suitable for wheat, the soil quality led to small scale farming and relatively equal distributions of wealth. This in turn led to an open franchise and broad public education. Sokoloff and Engerman conclude that areas such as the United States, which emphasized equality and access to public education, were able to progress faster economically than areas such as Cuba which did not allow such opportunities to its residents.

== Personal life ==
He was married to Judith Rader Engerman until she died in 2019. They had three sons.

Engerman died from myelodysplastic syndrome at his home in Watertown, Massachusetts, on May 11, 2023, at the age of 87.

== Works ==
- Time on the Cross: The Economics of American Negro Slavery (with Robert Fogel), 1974
- Race and Slavery in the Western Hemisphere: Quantitative Studies by Eugene D. Genovese and Stanley L. Engerman, 1975
- A Historical Guide to World Slavery by Seymour Drescher and Stanley L. Engerman (1998)
- Slavery, Emancipation, and Freedom: Comparative Perspectives (Walter Lynwood Fleming Lectures in Southern History) by Stanley L. Engerman (2007)
- Slavery (Oxford Readers) by Stanley Engerman, Seymour Drescher, and Robert Paquette (2001)
- The Evolution of Suffrage Institutions in the New World SL ENGERMAN, KL SOKOLOFF - The Journal of Economic History, 2005 - Cambridge Univ Press
- Institutional and Non-Institutional Explanations of Economic Differences SL ENGERMAN, KL SOKOLOFF - NBER Working Paper, 2003
- Economic Development in the Americas since 1500: Endowments and Institutions by Stanley L. Engerman and Kenneth L. Sokoloff, 2011
