= Kenneth Sokoloff =

American economist

- Born: July 27, 1952; Philadelphia, Pennsylvania
- Died: May 21, 2007 (aged 54); Los Angeles, California
- Education: University of Pennsylvania; Harvard University
- Known for: Economic history
- Scientific career
- Fields: Economic History
- Workplaces: UCLA
- Doctoral advisor: Robert Fogel

Kenneth Lee Sokoloff (July 27, 1952 – May 21, 2007) was an American economic historian who was broadly interested in the interaction between initial factor endowments, institutions, and economic growth. In particular, he examined the influence of factor endowments on economic development in the New World and the role of 19th century United States patent law in encouraging innovation.

== Career and personal life ==
Born in Philadelphia, Sokoloff graduated from the American School of Paris in 1970, earned his bachelor's degree from the University of Pennsylvania in 1974 and his doctorate from Harvard University in 1982 where Robert Fogel served as his advisor. He joined the faculty at the University of California, Los Angeles in 1980 where he spent the remainder of his career. He died of liver cancer in Los Angeles, California on May 21, 2007.

Kenneth grew up in Silver Spring, Maryland. He had a bone disease that was kept in submission by very expensive medications and transfusions, eventually leading to liver cancer and death. Despite his infirmity, he had an active and full life. His father was a famous scientist, Louis Sokoloff, who did pioneering work in brain metabolism, which led to the invention of PET scans.

== Academic Work ==
In a series of influential papers coauthored with Stanley Engerman, Sokoloff studied the impact of countries' initial factor endowments on their later political and economic development. While much of the contemporary literature explained different growth rates across countries by appealing to differences in national culture or religion, Sokoloff used historical data to claim that much of the differential growth experiences of the US colonies and of New World countries can be explained through differences in initial endowments of factors including human capital and levels of inequality. Moreover, Sokoloff and Engerman theorized that initial levels of wealth and political power inequality led to the development of institutions that perpetuated these inequalities, furthering their deleterious impact on long run economic growth. In Sokoloff and Engerman's paper "Institutions, Factors, Endowments, and Paths of Development in the New World," they outlined their theories about the effects of wealth, human capital, and political power disparity on economic growth. They maintained that these elements were fundamental in deciding how the United States and Canada developed differently from other New World colonies. They emphasized how, in contrast to colonies that relied on slave labor and saw extremely unequal distributions of wealth, human capital, and political power—particularly along racial lines—small family farms in the United States and Canada that produced grains contributed to a more egalitarian distribution of wealth. They also talked on the problem of educational disparity in the nations of Latin America. These nations' governments needed literacy even though they did not provide enough money for public schooling. Low literacy rates were caused by this lack of investment, and voting rates were affected. Thus, Sokoloff and Engerman contended that inadequate educational establishments could considerably impede economic advancement.

Sokoloff and his coauthors also sought to understand the relationship between economic institutions and technological innovation. In particular, Sokoloff stressed the importance of US patent institutions in fostering innovation by entrepreneurs. For instance, with Zorina Khan, Sokoloff examined the careers of 160 "great inventors" credited with significant technological discoveries during the early American industrialization. In contrast to previous findings, Sokoloff and Khan found that these inventors were active entrepreneurs who responded systematically to market incentives. On the other hand, Sokoloff, with Naomi Lamoreaux, found that over time the capital requirements associated with invention became prohibitively high, leading to firms taking over much of the innovative activity that was previously undertaken by individual entrepreneurs.
