= Philip M. Parker =

American economist and inventor

- Born: June 20, 1960 (age 66); U.S.

Academic background
- Education: Wharton School of the University of Pennsylvania

Academic work
- Institutions: INSEAD

Philip M. Parker (born June 20, 1960) is an American economist and academic, and currently the INSEAD Chaired Professor of Management Science at INSEAD in Fontainebleau, France. He has patented a method to automatically produce a set of similar books from a template that is filled with data from databases and Internet searches.

== Early life ==
Parker is dyslexic. He received undergraduate degrees in finance and economics. He received a Ph.D. in business economics from the Wharton School of the University of Pennsylvania. He has master's degrees in finance and banking from Aix-Marseille University and managerial economics from Wharton.

== Work ==
He was a professor of economics and business at the University of California, San Diego, before moving to INSEAD, where he has been a professor of marketing since 1988. His work focuses primarily on macroeconomics.

=== Projects in artificial intelligence ===
In 2025, Parker co-founded Xavier AI with Joao Filipe, a former McKinsey consultant. Xavier AI is a company that has launched an AI strategy consultant.

Since 2021, Parker has been developing a multilingual "content engine" project named Botipedia. Botipedia is an AI-powered research tool designed to automatically create encyclopedic articles.

=== Books on economics ===
Parker has written six books on national economic development and economic divergence. His books argue that consumer utility and consumption functions should be bounded by physical laws and against economic axioms that violate laws of physics, such as the conservation of energy.

- Climatic Effects on Individual, Social, and Economic Behavior, Greenwood Press, 1995
- Cross-Cultural Statistical Encyclopedia of the World, Greenwood Press, 1997. A four-volume encyclopedia that recasts international national economic statistics of the world into linguistic, religious, and ethnic groups.
- Physioeconomics: The Basis for Long-Run Economic Growth. MIT Press, 2000. This forecasts global economic and demographic trends to the year 2100: he concludes that long-run economic convergence between different cultural groups is unlikely. He explains why distance from the equator matters in economic development.

=== Online reference works ===
Parker is also involved in new media reference work projects. He is the creator of Webster's Online Dictionary: The Rosetta Edition, a multilingual online dictionary created in 1999. It uses the "Webster's" name, which is in the public domain. This site compiles different online dictionaries and encyclopedias including Webster's Revised Unabridged Dictionary (1913), Wiktionary, and Wikipedia.

== Automatically generated books ==
Most of Parker's automatically generated books target niche markets (the "long tail" concept). Examples include:

- Books series on medical subjects published by Icon Health Publications and coauthored with James N. Parker. The Official Patient's Sourcebook series deals with classic diseases like spinal stenosis or autoimmune hepatitis. The 3-in-1 Medical Reference series deals with general medical topics like hemoglobin.
- A series on the future demand for certain products in some areas of the world, mainly consisting of tables and graphs, published by his company Icon Group International, Inc. One book, The 2009-2014 World Outlook for 60-milligram Containers of Fromage Frais, won the 2008 Bookseller/Diagram Prize for Oddest Title of the Year.
- A series of cross-language crossword puzzle books, e.g., Webster's English to Italian Crossword Puzzles: Level 1, and Thesauri, e.g., Webster's Quechua – English Thesaurus Dictionary, published by Icon Group International, Inc. Some of these titles raised concerns with linguists who claimed inaccuracies and ownership/citation rights in specific languages covered in these volumes. Parker removed the concerned titles from print stating that he had not known that anyone claimed intellectual property rights over languages.
- A series of quotation collections subtitled Webster's Quotations, Facts, and Phrases, each volume assembling quotations that feature a specific English word. Excerpts are drawn from public domain literary sources and reference works, and from Wikipedia articles (identified as "WP" after a quotation). The English professor Nicholas Royle noted that Veering: Webster's Quotations, Facts and Phrases contained quotations unrelated to the word "veering" or using "Veer" only as a proper name; he described the book as "quite bizarre" and "absurdly expensive."

All books are self-published paperbacks. Ninety-five percent of the ordered books are sent out electronically; the rest are printed on demand. Parker plans to extend the programs to produce romance novels.

=== Digital poetry ===
Using a collection of automation programs called "Eve", Parker has applied his techniques to post over 1.3 million poems. He plans to generate one poem for each word found in the English language. He refers to these as "graph theoretic poems" since they are generated using graph theory. Parker says the poems are didactic, either defining the entry word in question or highlighting its antonyms.

== See also ==
- Books LLC
- Large language model
- Racter
- VDM Publishing
