= University of Sussex =

University in Brighton and Hove, England

Coordinates: 50°51′55″N 0°05′08″W

- Coat of arms
- Motto: Be Still and Know
- Type: Public research university
- Established: 1959 (University College of Sussex); 1961 (royal charter granted for university status)
- Affiliations: Universities UK, BUCS, Sepnet, SeNSS, Association of Commonwealth Universities, NCUB
- Endowment: £21.9 million (2025)
- Budget: £346.0 million (2024/25)
- Chancellor: Sanjeev Bhaskar
- Vice-Chancellor: Sasha Roseneil
- Visitor: King Charles III
- Academic staff: 1,985 (2024/25)
- Administrative staff: 1,840 (2024/25)
- Students: 17,290 (2024/25); 15,980 FTE (2024/25)
- Undergraduates: 12,920 (2024/25)
- Postgraduates: 4,375 (2024/25)
- Location: Falmer, Brighton, East Sussex, England
- Campus: Campus
- Colours: White and Flint
- Mascot: Badger
- Website: sussex.ac.uk

The University of Sussex is a public research university located in Falmer, East Sussex, England. It lies mostly within the city boundaries of Brighton and Hove. Its large campus site is surrounded by the South Downs National Park, and provides convenient access to central Brighton 5.5 kilometres (3 1/2 miles) away. The university received its royal charter in August 1961, the first of what later was called the plate glass university generation.

More than a third of its students are enrolled in postgraduate programmes and approximately a third of staff are from outside the United Kingdom. Sussex has a diverse community of nearly 20,000 students, with around one in three being foreign students, and over 1,000 academics, representing over 140 different nationalities. The annual income of the institution for 2024–25 was £346 million of which £39.8 million was from research grants and contracts, with an expenditure of £372.9 million.

Sussex counts five Nobel Prize winners, 15 Fellows of the Royal Society, 10 Fellows of the British Academy, 24 fellows of the Academy of Social Sciences and a winner of the Crafoord Prize among its faculty. By 2011, many of its faculty members had also received the Royal Society of Literature Prize, the Order of the British Empire and the Bancroft Prize. Alumni include heads of states, diplomats, politicians, eminent scientists and activists.

== History ==
=== 20th century ===
In an effort to establish a university to serve Sussex, a public meeting was held in December 1911 at the Royal Pavilion in Brighton to discover ways to fund the construction of a university; the project was halted by World War I, and the money raised was used instead for books for the Municipal Technical College.

The idea was revived in the 1950s, and in June 1958 the government approved the corporation's scheme for a university at Brighton, to be the first of a new generation of what came to be known as plate glass universities. The university was established as a company in 1959, with a Royal Charter being granted on 16 August 1961. This was the first university to be established in the UK since the Second World War, apart from Keele University. The university's organisation broke new ground in seeing the campus divided into Schools of Study, with students able to benefit from a multidisciplinary teaching environment. Sussex would emphasise cross-disciplinary activity, so that students would emerge from the university with a range of background or 'contextual' knowledge to complement their specialist 'core' skills in a particular subject area. For example, arts students spent their first year taking sciences while science students took arts.This experimental interdisciplinary educational model was famously described by Professor Asa Briggs as pioneering "a new map of learning".

The university grew from 52 students in 1961–62 to 3,200 in 1967–68. After starting at Knoyle Hall in Brighton, the Falmer campus was gradually built with Falmer House opening in 1962. The campus was praised as gorgeously modernist and groundbreaking, receiving numerous awards. The student union, as is typical, organised events and concerts, bringing in acts like Pink Floyd, Jimi Hendrix and Chuck Berry to perform at the University Common Room.

Academically, Sussex was home to figures such as Asa Lord Briggs, Helmut Pappe, Gillian Rose, Christopher Freeman, Norman MacKenzie, Fernando Henriques, Jennifer Platt and Tom Bottomore. In its first years, the university attracted a number of renowned academics such as Sir John Cornforth, John Maynard Smith, Martin Wight, David Daiches, Roger Blin-Stoyle and Colin Eaborn. Similarly, renowned scholars like Marcus Cunliffe, Gabriel Josipovici, Quentin Bell, Dame Helen Wallace, Stuart Sutherland and Marie Jahoda also became central figures at the university and founded many of its current departments. Additionally, a number of initiatives at the university were started at this time, such as the Subaltern Studies Group, founded by Ranajit Guha who was Reader in History at Sussex between 1962 and 1981.

In the late 1960s, the United Nations asked for science policy recommendations from a team of renowned academics at Sussex. The ensuing report became known as the Sussex Manifesto.

Sussex came to be identified with student radicalism. In 1973, a group of students prevented United States government adviser Samuel P. Huntington from giving a speech on campus, because of his involvement in the Vietnam War. Similarly, when the spokesperson for the US embassy, Robert Beers, visited to give a talk to students entitled 'Vietnam in depth' three students were waiting outside Falmer House and threw a bucket of red paint over the diplomat as he was leaving.

In both 1967 and 1969, Sussex won the television quiz University Challenge.

In 1980, Sussex edged out the University of Oxford to become the university with the highest income from research grants and contracts.

=== 21st century ===
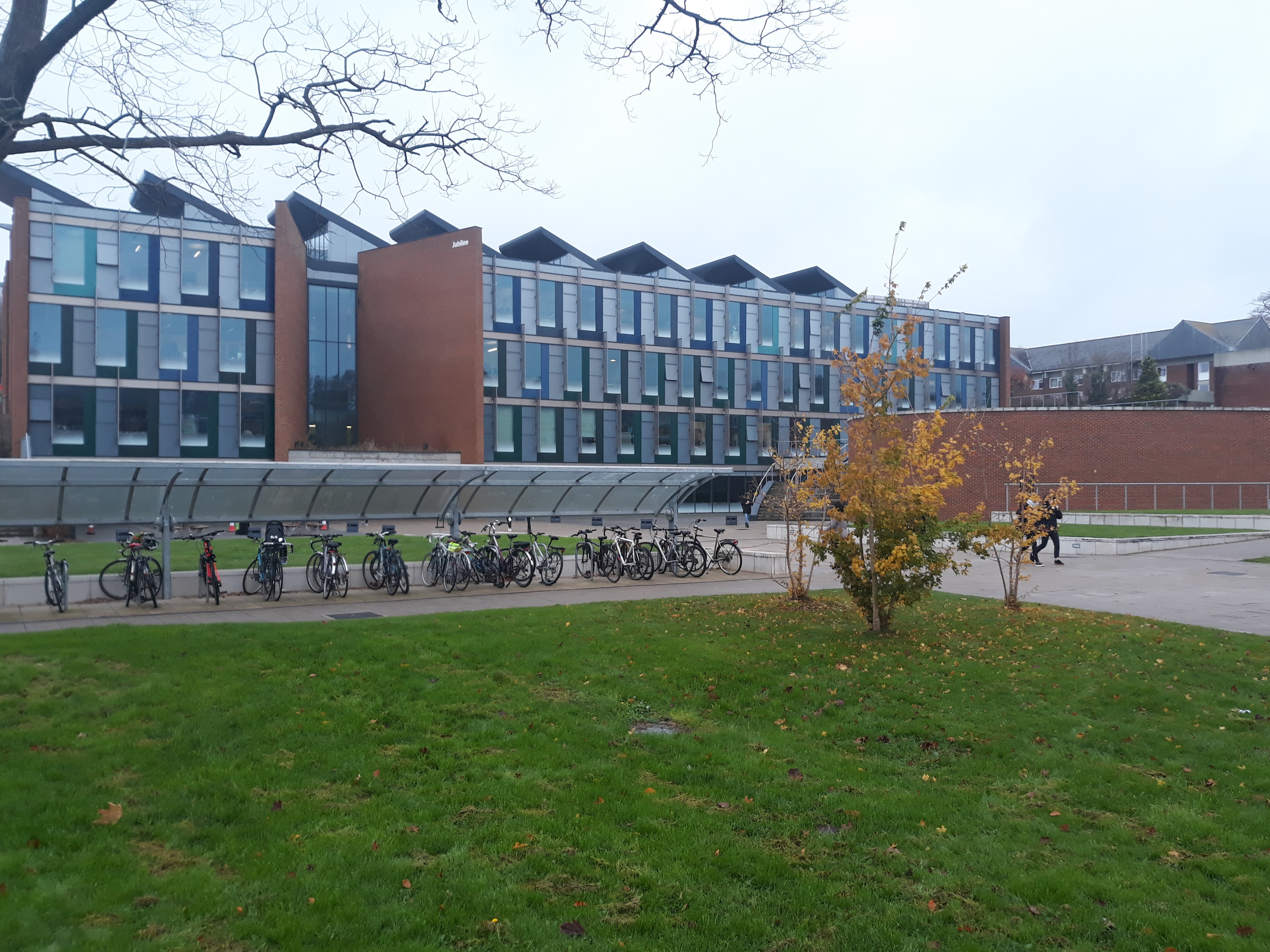
The Jubilee Building

In an attempt to appeal to a modern audience, the university chose in 2004 to cease using its coat of arms and to replace it with the "US" logo.

In 2011, Sussex celebrated its 50th anniversary and saw the production of a number of works including a book on the university's history and an oral history and photography project. The university launched its first major fundraising campaign, Making the Future, and gathered over £51.3 million.

The university underwent a number of changes with the Sussex Strategic Plan 2009–2015, including the introduction of new academic courses, the opening of new research centres, the renovation and refurbishment of a number of its schools and buildings as well as the ongoing expansion of its student housing facilities.

In 2018, the university moved all of its investments out of fossil fuels (known as fossil fuel divestment) after a four-year student union run campaign.

In 2021, during the COVID-19 pandemic, Sussex was one of few universities that returned to real-world teaching. Most lectures at other universities chose to remain online-only.

== Controversies ==
In March 2011, a sex trafficking ring, involving one of the university's Park Village accommodation flats, was uncovered after a university building manager received an email advertising sex services, eventually leading to the conviction of a British woman and 4 Hungarian men for blackmailing foreign women into working in illegal brothels across the country.

In October 2021 a student campaign called for Kathleen Stock's dismissal. In October 2021, the university's vice-chancellor Professor Adam Tickell gave his support to Stock who has been accused of transphobia. The Times reported students have called for Stock's dismissal and claimed that she has been victimised. Following Tickell's statement, the Sussex branch of the University and College Union (UCU) called for an investigation into "institutional transphobia" at the University of Sussex. Students have accused the university management of being "anti-student and pro-transphobia". Taiwo Owatemi, the Shadow Minister for Women and Equalities, called UCU's statement "strong and principled".

In March 2025, Sussex was fined £585,000 by the Office for Students (OfS), which said it had failed to uphold freedom of speech in its trans and non-binary equality policy statement passed in 2018. The statement stated that course materials should "positively represent trans people" and that "transphobic propaganda" would not be tolerated. The OfS gave the case of Kathleen Stock as an example of the "chilling effect" this had on expression of lawful views. Professor Sasha Roseneil, the university's vice chancellor claimed "the way the OfS has conducted this investigation has been completely unacceptable, its findings are egregious and concocted, and the fine that is being imposed on Sussex is wholly disproportionate." The university challenged the decision with a high court legal case that was heard in February 2026. The fine was rejected by the High Court on 29 April 2026 with the High court finding that the trans and non-binary policy was not a governing document and that the OfS was biased during the investigation.

== Campus ==
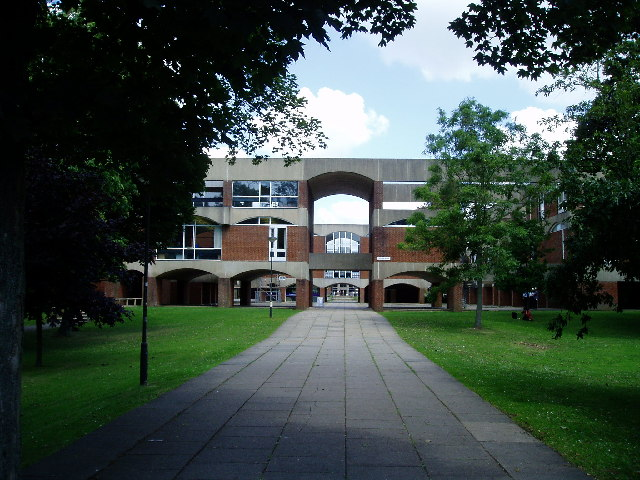
Grade I listed Falmer House

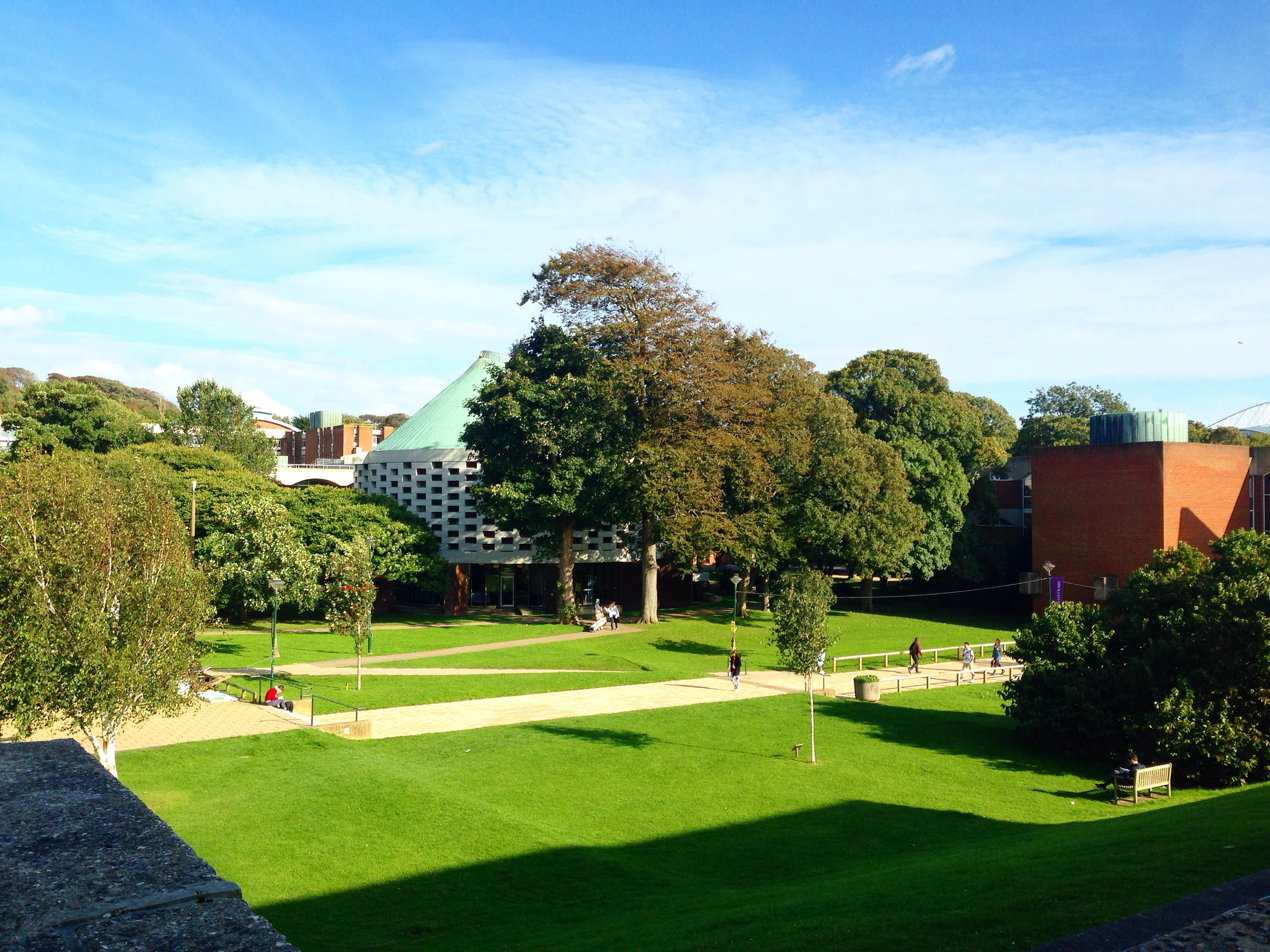
A picture of Meeting House

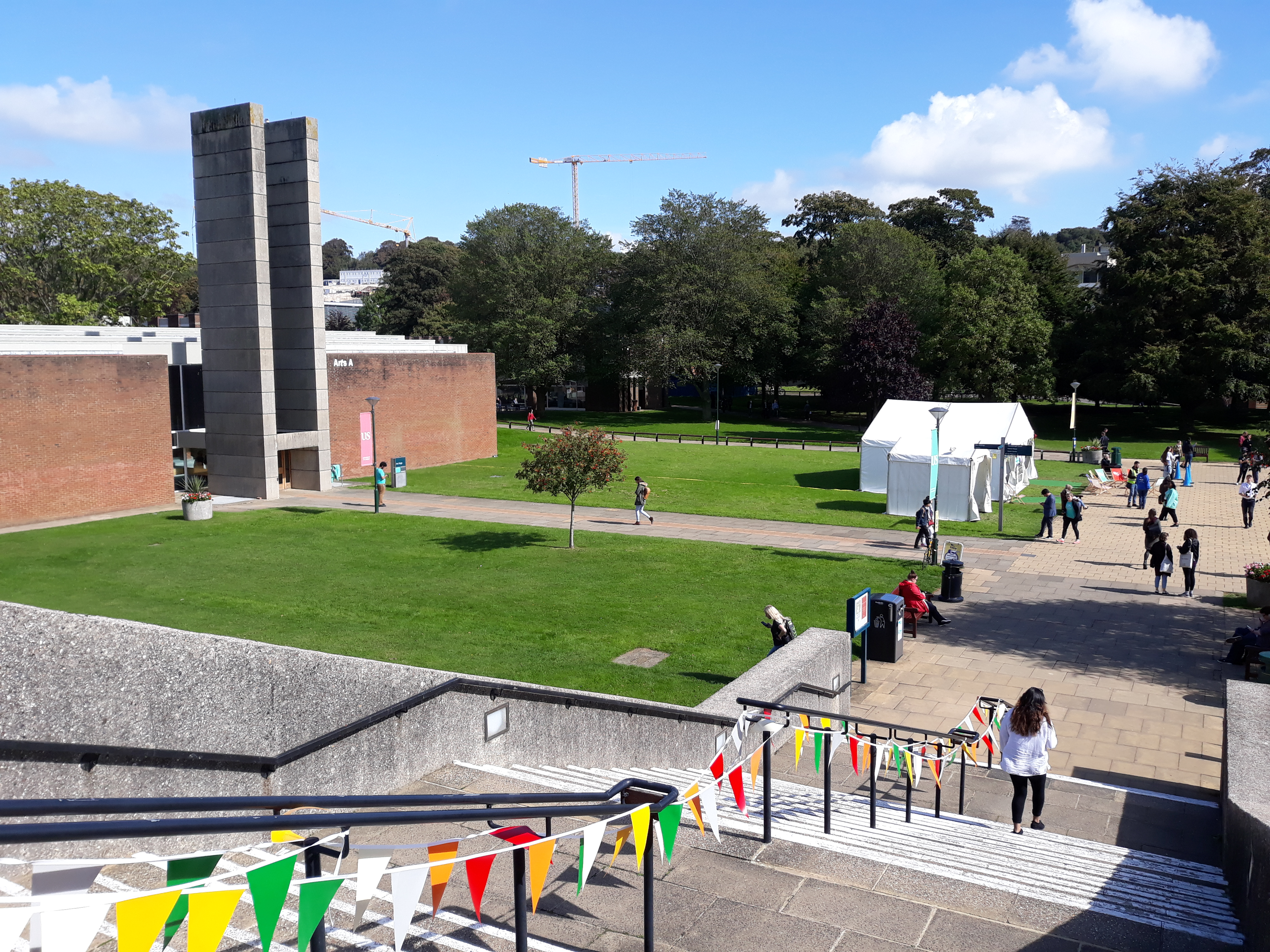
View of Arts A

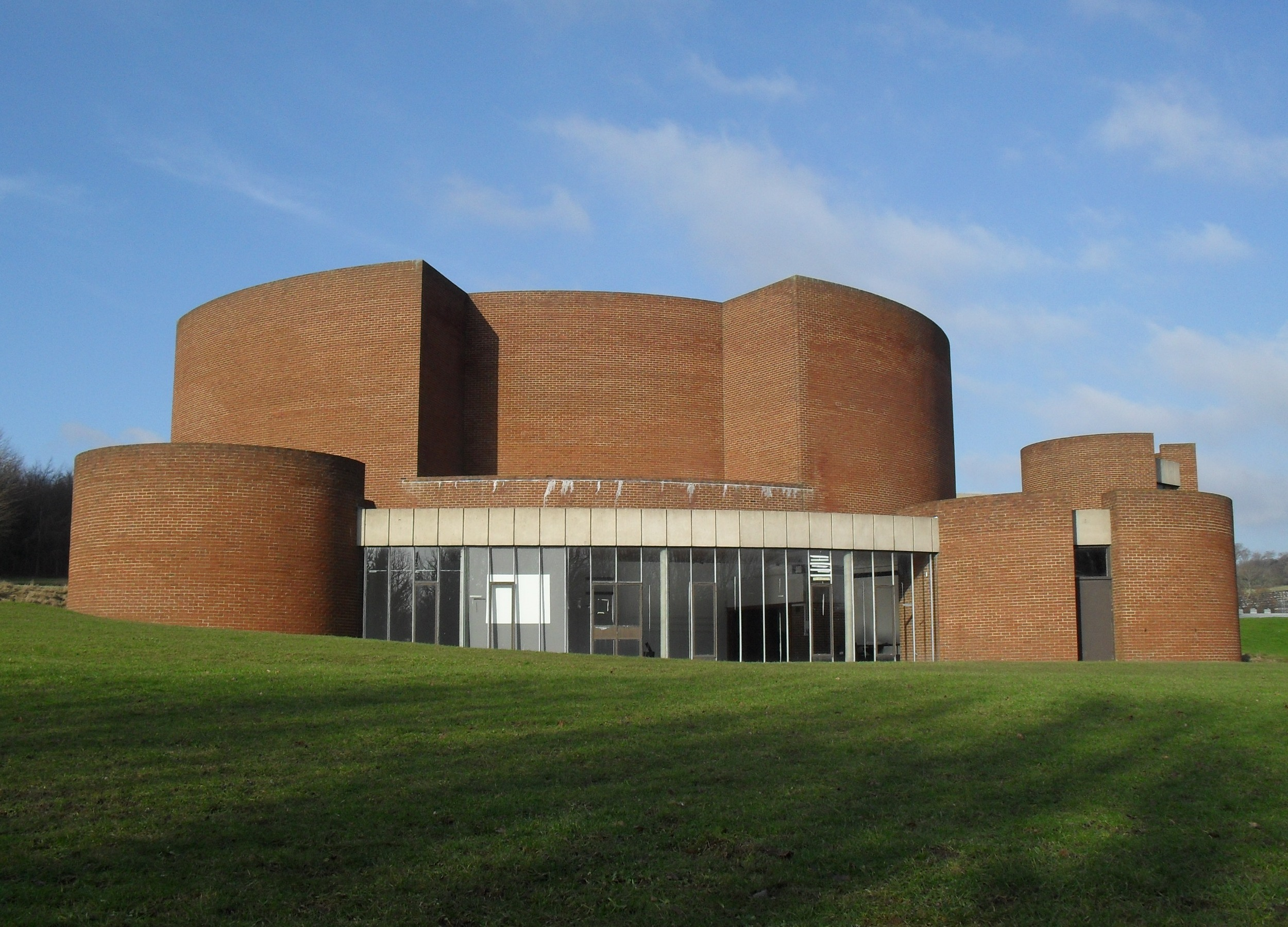
Attenborough Centre for the Creative Arts

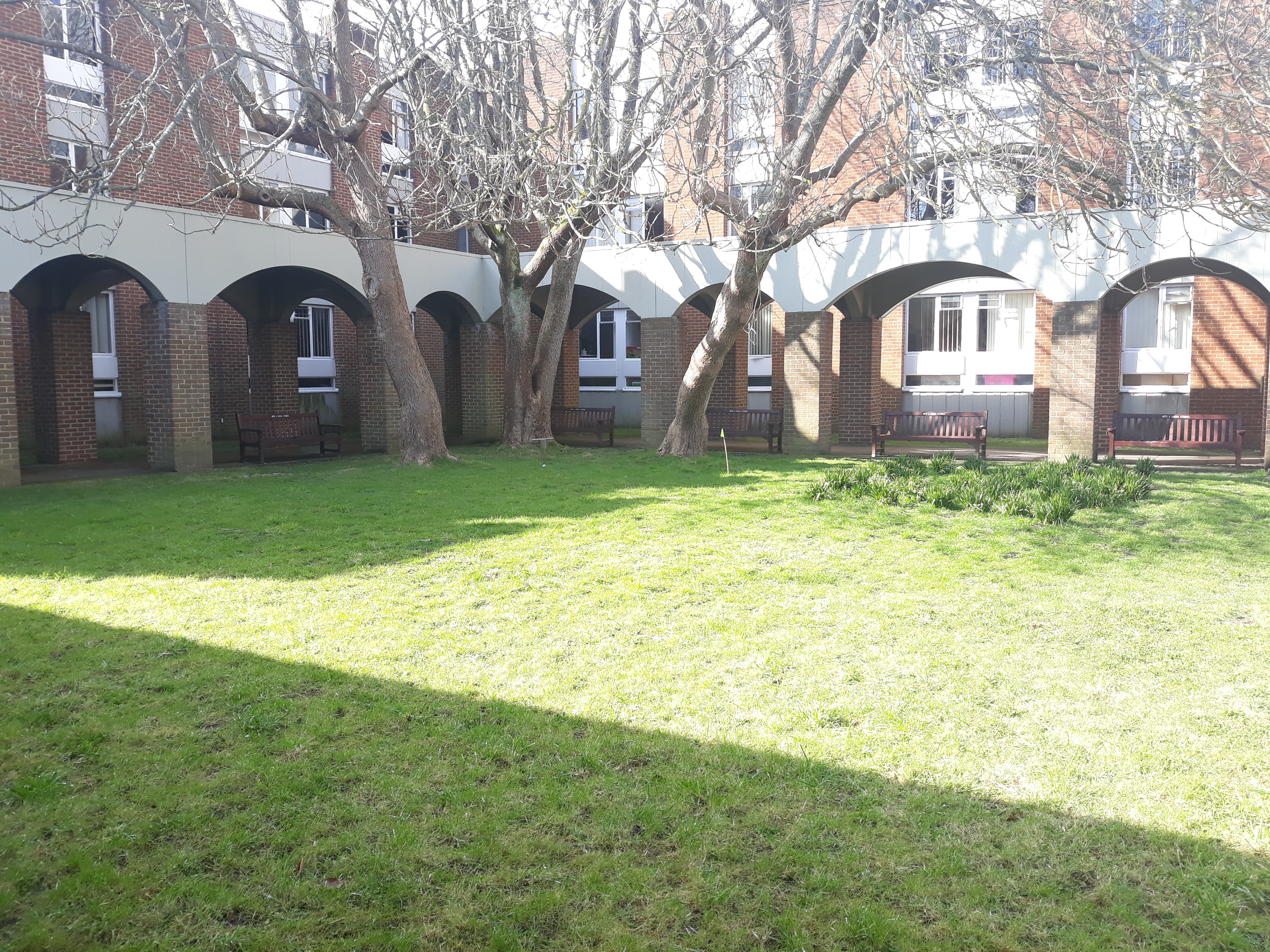
Arts Inner courtyard, characteristic of the Spence design

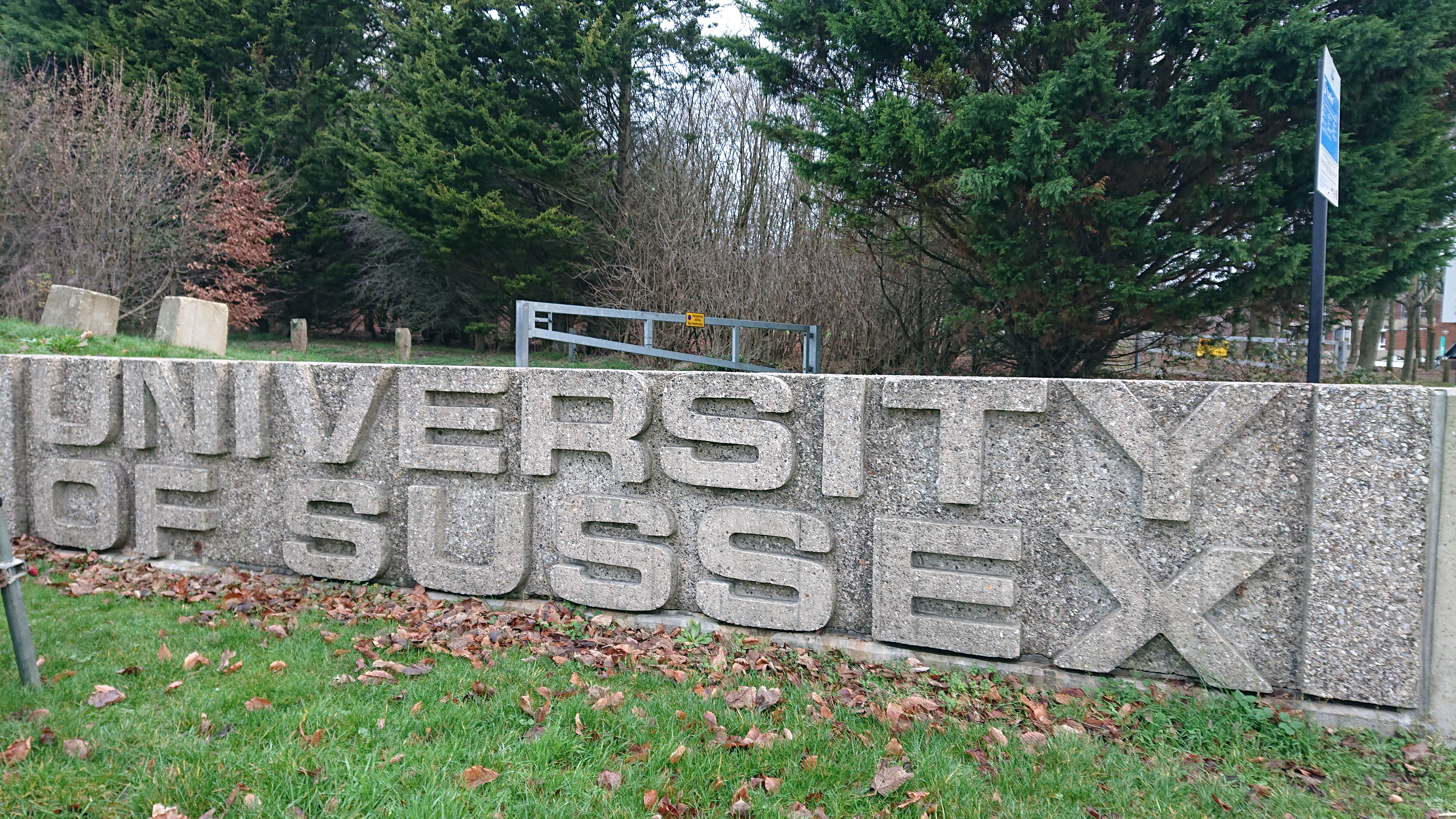
University of Sussex Monolith

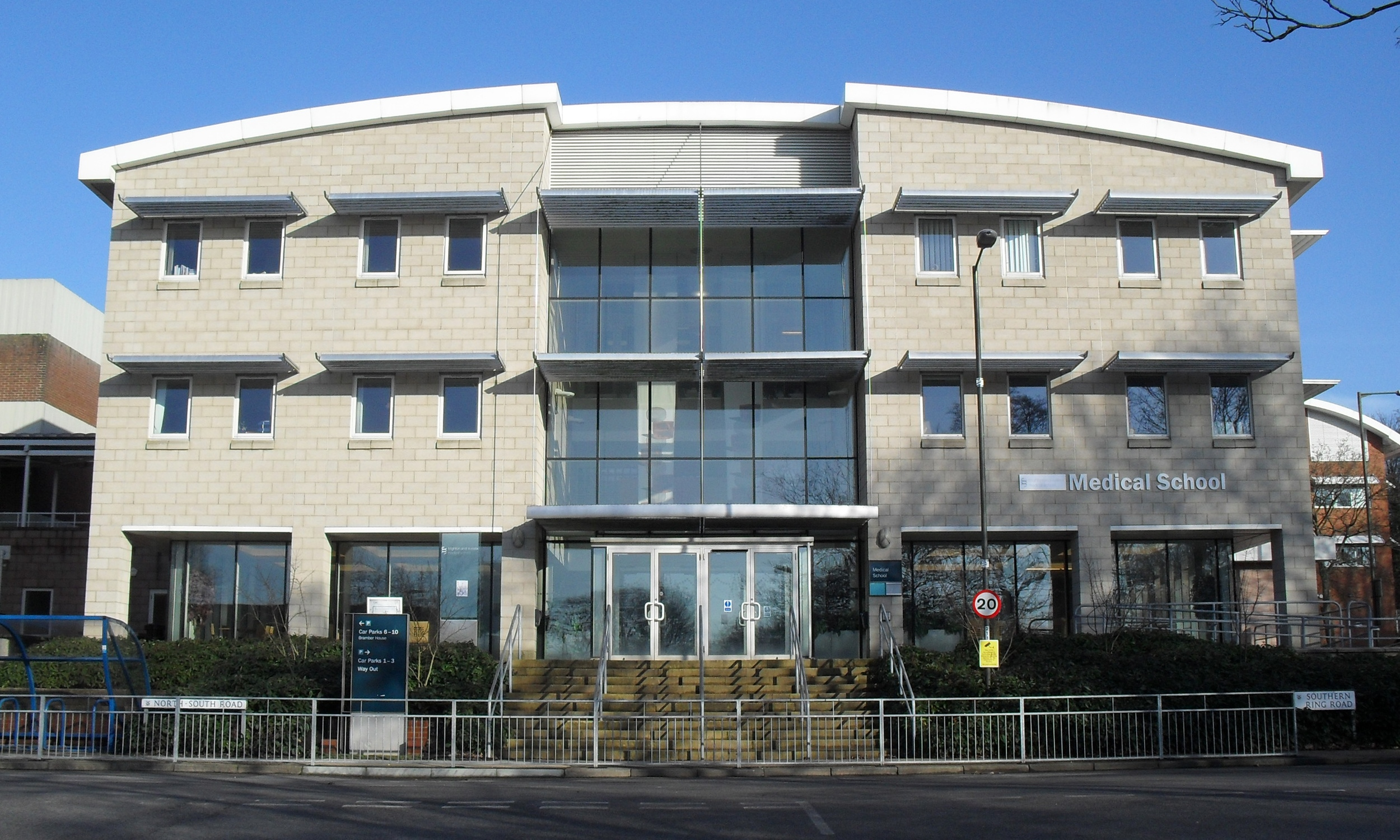
Brighton and Sussex Medical School

The University of Sussex is situated near the city of Brighton and Hove, next to the Stanmer Park reserve, and extends into the Lewes District in its eastern fringe. The closest train station is Falmer railway station, located at about nine minutes from Brighton station. The campus is also close to the medieval town of Lewes and is approximately an hour away from London. Located within the South Downs National Park, it is the only English university existing in a National Park.

The campus, designed by Sir Basil Spence, is next to the village of Falmer but mostly within the city boundaries of Brighton and Hove. It is close to the South Downs, which influenced Spence's design of the campus. In 1959, the Basil Spence and Partners company began planning and designing the campus, to be built over a 15-year period. In 1971, 17 buildings had been designed and built winning numerous awards including a medal from the Royal Institute of British Architects and a Civic Trust award. Spence expressed his awe at the beauty of the surrounding region and designed the campus as a stream of low buildings so as not to disturb the natural scenery around. Brick was chosen throughout as it was the dominant material used across Sussex. As the campus developed, Spence connected the buildings by a series of 'green, interlocking courtyards that he felt created a sense of enclosure'.

The campus is self-contained, with facilities including eights cafes/restaurants, a post office, a Co-op Food store, a market, a bank, a pharmacy, a health centre (including a dentist) and childcare facilities. Spence's designs were appreciated by architects; many of the campus buildings won awards. A number of features define these buildings, including the materials used and the fact that many of them have planted and tree-filled courtyards. The gatehouse-inspired Falmer House won a bronze medal from the Royal Institute of British Architects. In 1993, the buildings which made up the core of Spence's designs were given listed building status, with Falmer House being awarded the highest designation, Grade 1, as a building of "exceptional interest". A number of the original buildings are now Grade II listed buildings.

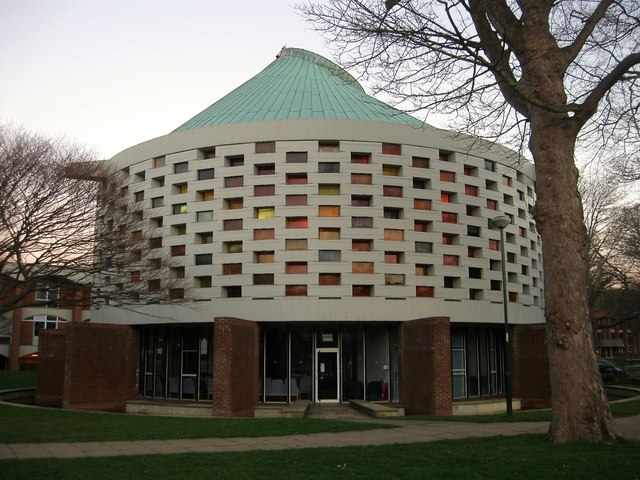
The Meeting House

The Meeting House at the University of Sussex is a striking circular chapel designed by Spence and completed in 1966. Built from patterned brick with a dramatic, light-filled interior, it serves as a multi-faith space for worship, reflection, and events. Its distinctive modernist design makes it a landmark on the university's campus. In 1969 it won the Civic Trust award and was listed in 1993 alongside other buildings on the campus. Inside, adorning the organ loft, is a large, colourful tapestry designed by John Piper commissioned in 1976 to celebrate 10 years since the building was completed. It was inspired by the university's motto 'Be still, and know', which is taken from Psalm 46. Its colours echo the honeycomb of coloured glass panes.

Sussex laid claim to being the "only English university located entirely within a designated Area of Outstanding Natural Beauty". It is now entirely surrounded by the newly founded South Downs National Park.

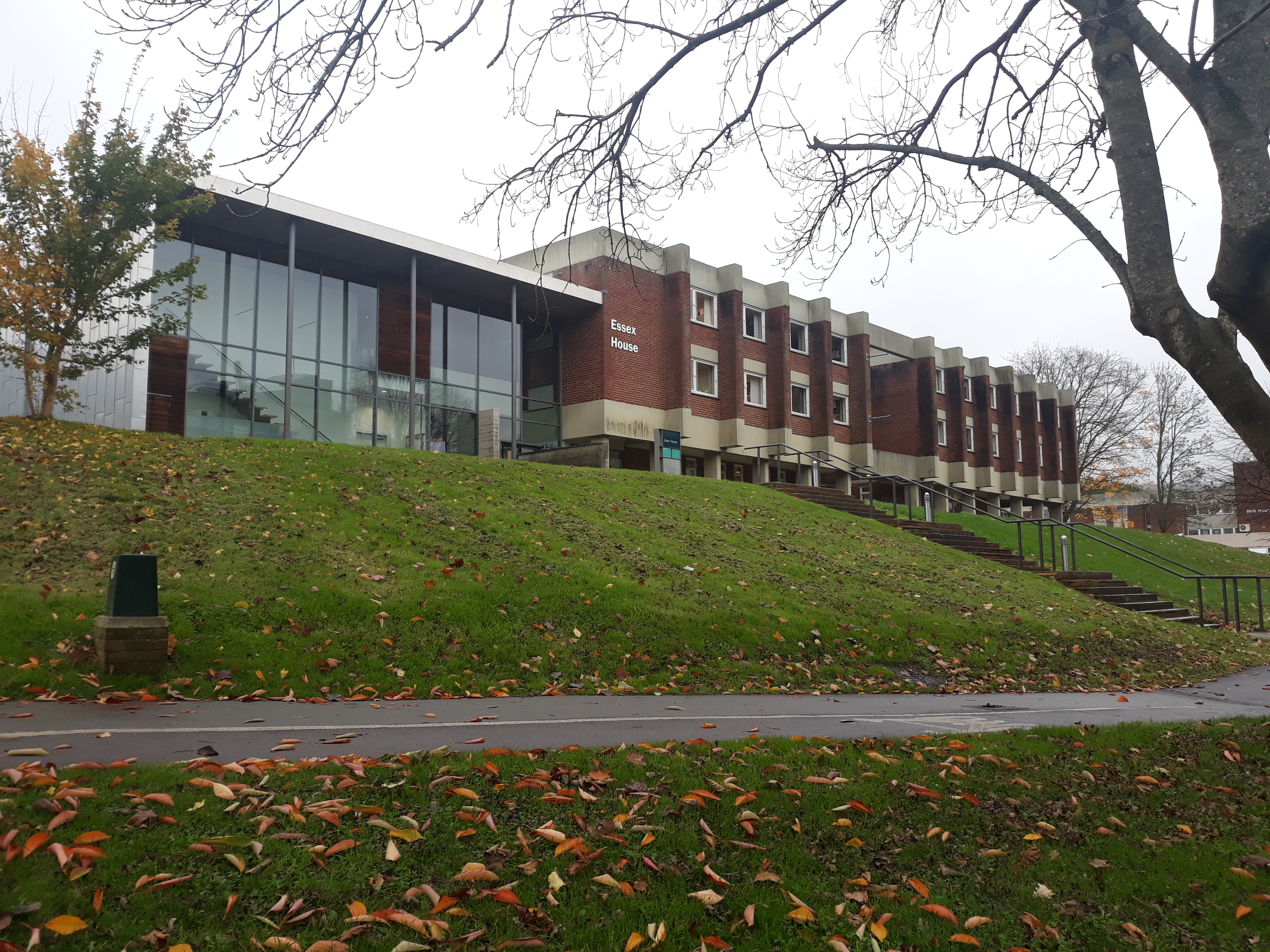
Essex House

The Gardner Arts Centre, another of Basil Spence's designs, was opened in 1969 as the first university campus arts centre. It had a 480-seat purpose-built theatre, a visual art gallery and studio space, and was frequently used for theatre and dance as well as showing a range of films on a modern cinema screen. The Centre closed in the summer of 2007: withdrawal of funding and the cost of renovating the building were given as the key reasons. Following an extensive refurbishment, the Centre reopened as the Attenborough Centre for the Creative Arts (ACCA) in the autumn of 2015, and a public performance programme started in Spring 2016. The centre is now a national arts and performance hub hosting various kinds of performances year-round.

The campus has facilities such as the Genome Damage and Stability Centre; the medical imaging equipment at the Brighton and Sussex Medical School (BSMS); and the university's Library, until 2013 the home of the Mass Observation Archive, which relocated to The Keep, a purpose-built archive facility nearby.

=== Library ===
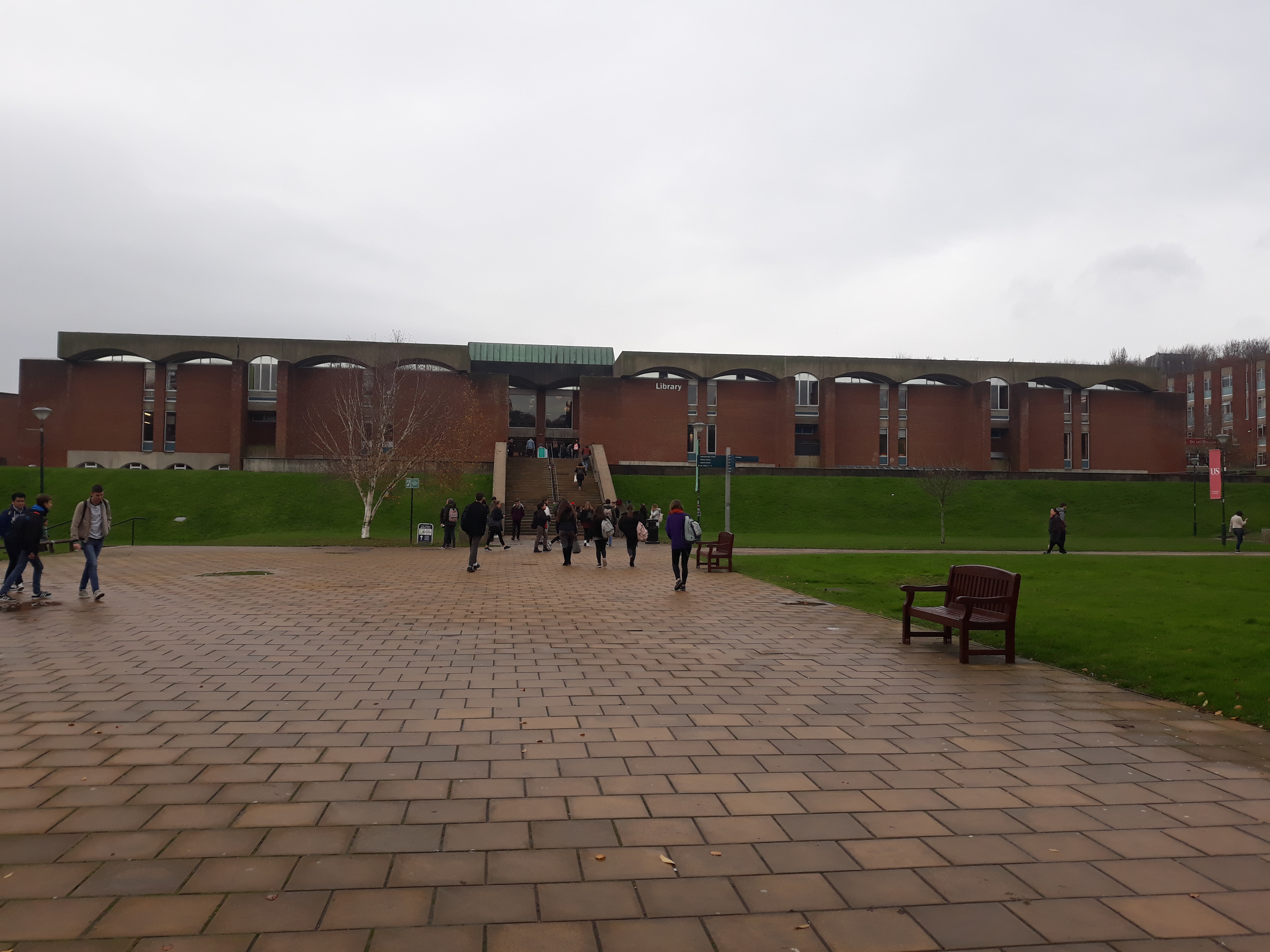
The Sussex Main Library

The university's main library is at the centre of its campus. It was opened by Queen Elizabeth II on 13 November 1964. The Royal Literary fund office is based at the Library, providing support for students around academic writing. The Library also houses a research support centre and a research hive for PhD students and research staff. There is also a Skills Hub, training facilities, a support centre, a café and a Careers and Employability Centre.

There are also smaller libraries within individual schools and research centres, as well as The Keep.

The university holds a number of acclaimed collections and archives, mostly related to twentieth-century literary, political and cultural history. Collections include original manuscripts and first editions by Virginia Woolf, Jane Austen and Rudyard Kipling as well as The New Statesman Archive and the Mass-Observation Archive.

== Organisation and administration ==
=== Schools of Studies ===
The university was founded with the unusual structure of "Schools of Study" (ubiquitously abbreviated to "schools") rather than traditional university departments within arts and science faculties.

In the early 1990s, the university promoted the system by claiming "[c]lusters of faculty [come] together within schools to pursue new areas of intellectual enquiry. The schools also foster broader intellectual links. Physics with Management Studies, Science and Engineering with European Studies, Economics with Mathematics all reach beyond conventional Arts/Science divisions." By this time the original schools had been developed somewhat and were:

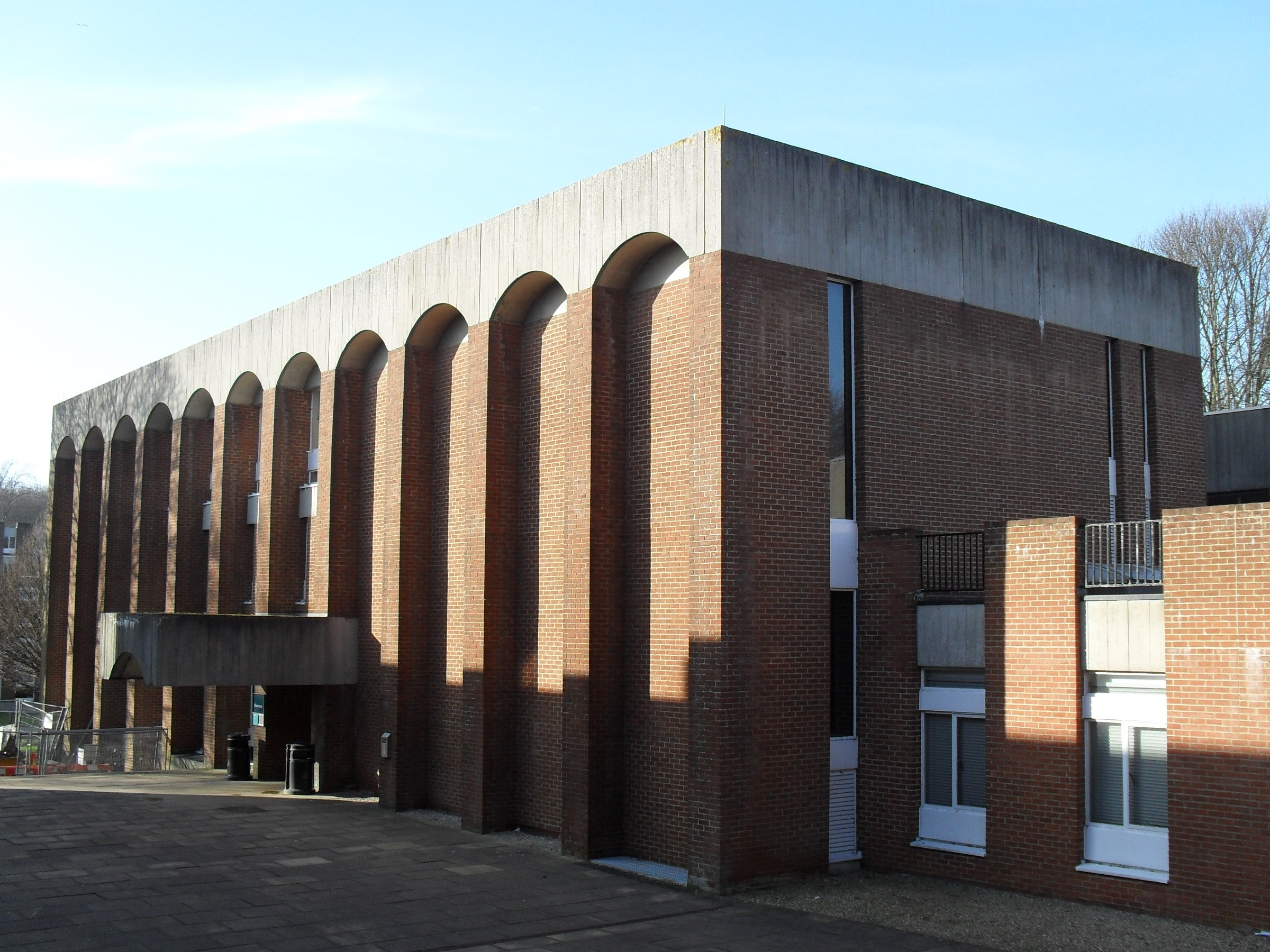
Shawcross Building

- African and Asian Studies (abbreviated to AFRAS)
- Biological Sciences (BIOLS)
- Chemistry and Molecular Sciences (MOLS)
- Cognitive and Computing Sciences (COGS)
- Cultural and Community Studies (CCS)
- Engineering and Applied Sciences (ENGG, formerly EAPS)
- English and American (ENGAM or EAM)
- European Studies (EURO)
- Mathematical and Physical Sciences (MAPS)
- Social Sciences (SOC)

There was also the Institute of Development Studies (IDS). This is still located on Sussex's campus, but is now a separate institution.

In 2001, as the university celebrated its 40th anniversary, the then Vice-Chancellor Alasdair Smith proposed major changes to the curriculum across the "Arts schools", and the senate agreed to structural changes which would create two Arts schools and a "Sussex Institute" in place of the five schools then in place. Corresponding changes would be made in Sciences.

The changes were finally implemented in September 2003. After discussion in senate and the schools, disciplinary departments which had been located across the different schools, were located firmly within one school, and undergraduates were offered straightforward degree subjects. The multi-disciplinarity provided by the school courses was now to be achieved through elective courses from other departments and schools.

In 2009 the university adopted a new organisational structure. The term "Schools of Studies" was retained, but each was headed by a "Head of School" rather than the traditional "Dean".

In 2020 the School of English, School of History, Art History and Philosophy, and School of Media, Film and Music were merged to create the School of Media, Arts and Humanities.

The schools as of 2020 are listed below.

The term "department" has been retained in some cases, where a school contains separate disciplines.

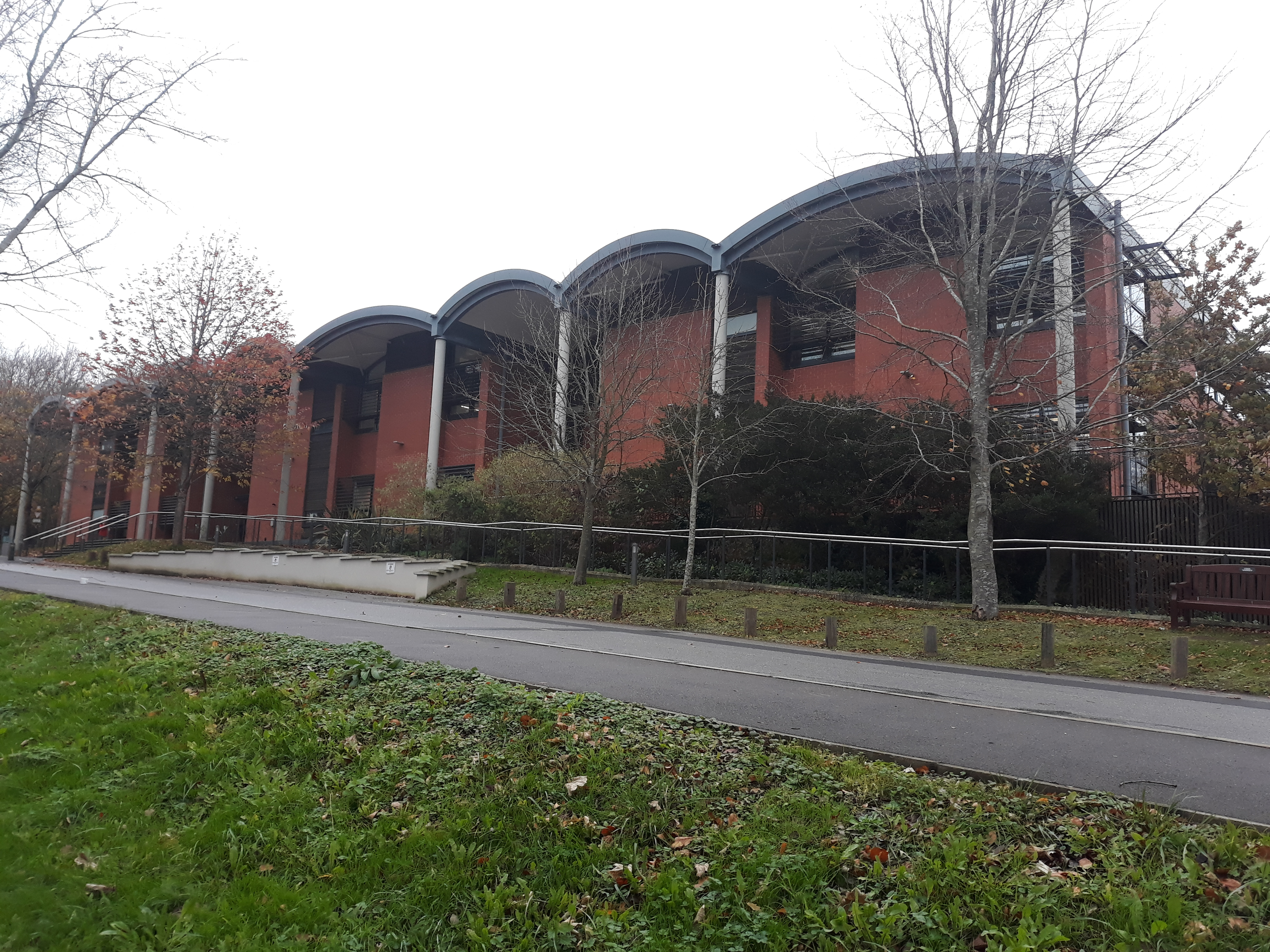
The Law, Politics and Sociology school

- School of Engineering and Informatics (two separate schools before 2011)
- School of Life Sciences (includes Biology, Environmental Science, Chemistry and Biochemistry and houses the Centre for Genome Damage and Stability)
- School of Mathematical and Physical Sciences (MPS) (includes Mathematics, Physics and Astronomy)
- School of Psychology
- School of Education and Social Work (ESW)
- School of Global Studies (includes Anthropology, Geography, International Development and International Relations, as well as interdisciplinary programmes in Development Studies)
- School of Law, Politics and Sociology (LPS)
- School of Media, Arts and Humanities (MAH) (three separate schools before 2020)
- University of Sussex Business School

None of these changes have affected the Brighton and Sussex Medical School (BSMS).

==== Doctoral School ====
The Doctoral School supports PhD student and Post-docs across all schools and departments and supports PhD students and Post-Docs through the Sussex Research hive, the Researcher Development Program, funding schemes as well as its own partnerships.

=== Chancellors and Vice-Chancellors ===
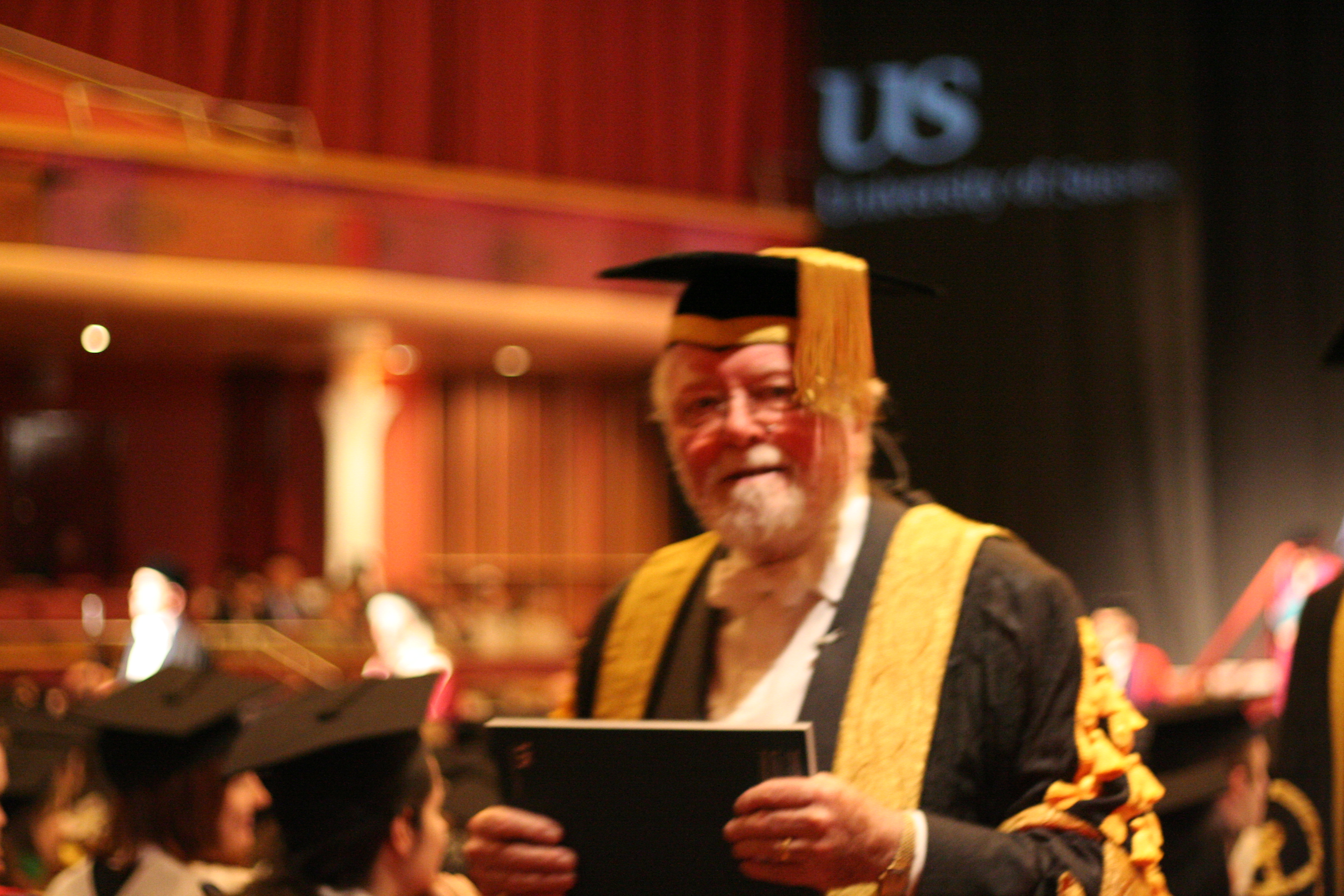
Lord Attenborough in academic regalia

The current and fifth Chancellor of the university is Sanjeev Bhaskar, who succeeded Lord Attenborough in 2009.

Name of Chancellor	Period
Walter Monckton, 1st Viscount Monckton of Brenchley	1961–65
Hartley Shawcross	1965–85
Charles Gordon-Lennox, 10th Duke of Richmond	1985–98
Richard Attenborough	1998–2009
Sanjeev Bhaskar	2009–present

The university has had nine Vice-Chancellors:

Name of Vice-Chancellor	Period
John Fulton	1961–67
Asa Briggs	1967–76
Denys Wilkinson	1976–87
Leslie Fielding	1987–92
Gordon Conway	1992–98
Alasdair Smith	1998–2007
Michael Farthing	2007–16
Adam Tickell	2016–21
David Maguire (interim)	2021–2022
Sasha Roseneil	2022–present

=== Finances ===
In the financial year ending 31 July 2024, Sussex had a total income of £379.6 million (2022/23 – £380.1 million) and total expenditure of £291.3 million (2022/23 – £345.1 million). Key sources of income included £224.6 million from tuition fees and education contracts (2022/23 – £222.2 million), £37.3 million from funding body grants (2022/23 – £39.9 million), £39.9 million from research grants and contracts (2022/23 – £42 million), £7.8 million from investment income (2022/23 – £7.4 million) and £4 million from donations and endowments (2022/23 – £5.3 million).

At year end, Sussex had endowments of £21.1 million (2022/23 – £16.4 million) and total net assets of £505.5 million (2022/23 – £414.7 million).

== Academic profile ==
The university, a member of the Erasmus charter, offers over 400 Undergraduate programs, over 210 Postgraduate taught programs and over 70 PhD programs. It is research-led, with around 1,000 teaching and research staff of which around 300 are research-only staff. Additionally, there are over 1200 PhD students at the university distributed across the different Schools. The university fees are at £9,250 per year for home fee status undergraduates, the highest a university can charge in the United Kingdom.

=== Reputation and rankings ===
Rankings
National rankings
- Complete (2027): 36
- Guardian (2027): 47
- Times / Sunday Times (2027): 47=

Global rankings
- ARWU (2026): 201–300
- QS (2027): 273=
- THE (2026): 201–250

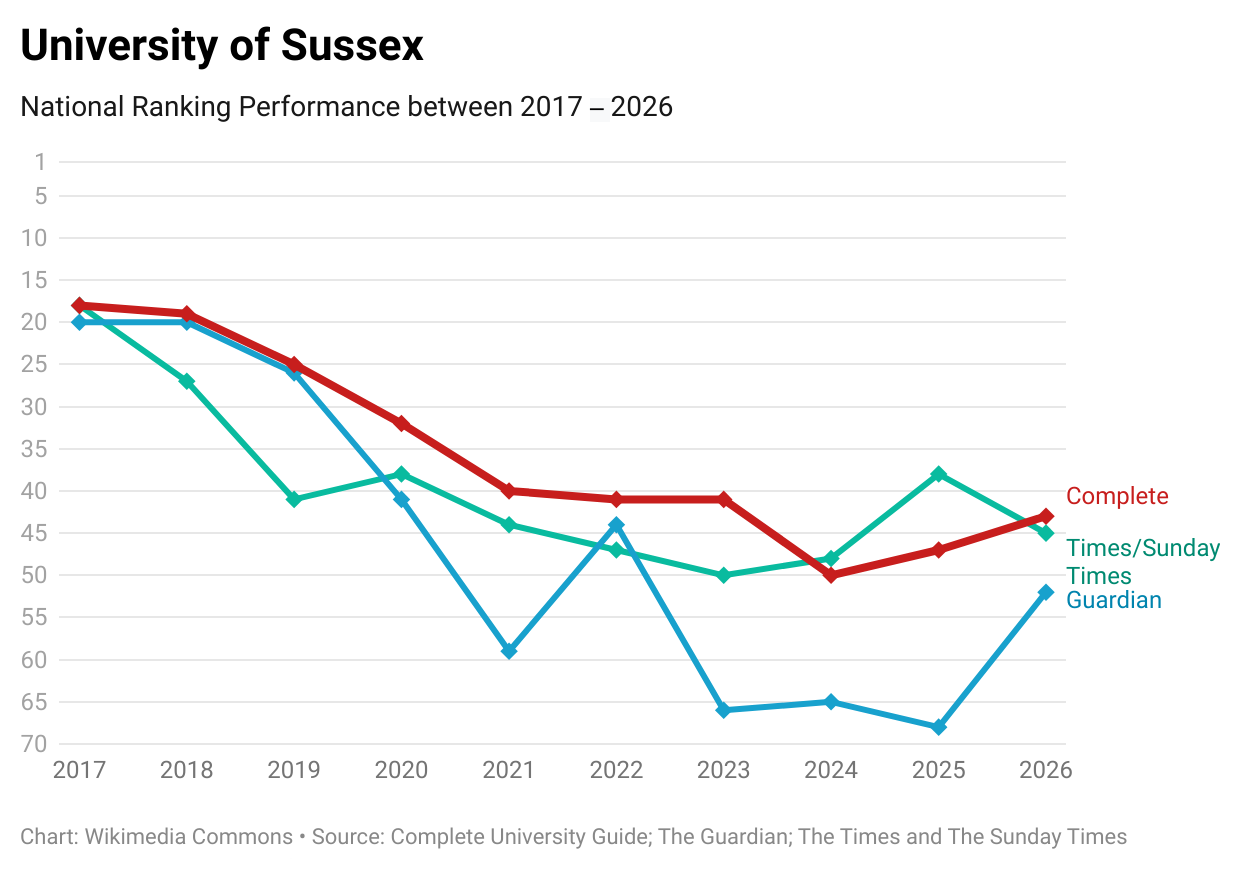
University of Sussex's national league table performance over the past ten years

The University of Sussex was ranked 30th in the UK and 201 - 250th in the world by the Times Higher Education World University Rankings 2024. The Times/Sunday Times placed the university 45th nationally in 2026. The university was ranked 43rd in the UK by the 2026 Complete University Guide. The university was ranked 278th in the world according to the QS World University Rankings 2026.

The Complete University guide 2018 ranked Sussex as sixth in the UK for Graduate prospects and 1st in the South East (graduates getting into employment or further study immediately after graduation).

Subject

In subject rankings, it was ranked 1st in the world for development studies in 2021. Ranked 29th in the world in the 2018 Times Higher Education World University Rankings for the social sciences, 11th in Europe and 7th nationally. It ranked as 49th in the world for Law and 48th for Business and Economics. In the same year, it ranked 4th in the UK for Sociology, 7th for Geography, 4th for Politics and International Relations, 10th for Psychology and 2nd for Communication and Media Studies by the Times Higher Education rankings by subject.

The university also ranked in the top 100 in the world for the social sciences in the CWTS Leiden Ranking 2016 and in the top 150 in the world for Social Sciences in the Academic Ranking of World Universities 2016 and 90th best in the world for Psychological Sciences in the U.S. News & World Report.

The QS World University Rankings by Subject for 2016, 2017 and 2018 placed the University 1st in the world for Development Studies. Further, it ranked in the world's top 100 for Anthropology, Sociology, Politics and International Studies, History, Geography, English Language and Literature and Communication and Media Studies in the QS 2018 rankings. Other top 150 subject rankings in the world include Education, Economics and Psychology.

=== Research ===
In 2017, Sussex's research income was around £65 million. This primarily came from funding body grants and research grants and contracts.

In addition to being home to Institute of Development Studies, Sussex has over 40 university research centres, over 15 strategic research centres and many smaller research clusters. IDS is ranked as 1st in the UK, 2nd International Development Think Tank and 4th university affiliated Think Tank in the world (out of 8,000 think tanks ranked) by the University of Pennsylvania Global Go To Think Tank Index Report 2017.

Sussex research centres include SPRU, the Science Policy Research Unit, which is ranked as 3rd best Science and technology Think Tank in the World (out of 8,000 think tanks ranked by the University of Pennsylvania Global Go To Think Tank Index Report 2017) Other notable centres include the STEPS Centre, the Centre for American Studies and the Sussex European Institute.

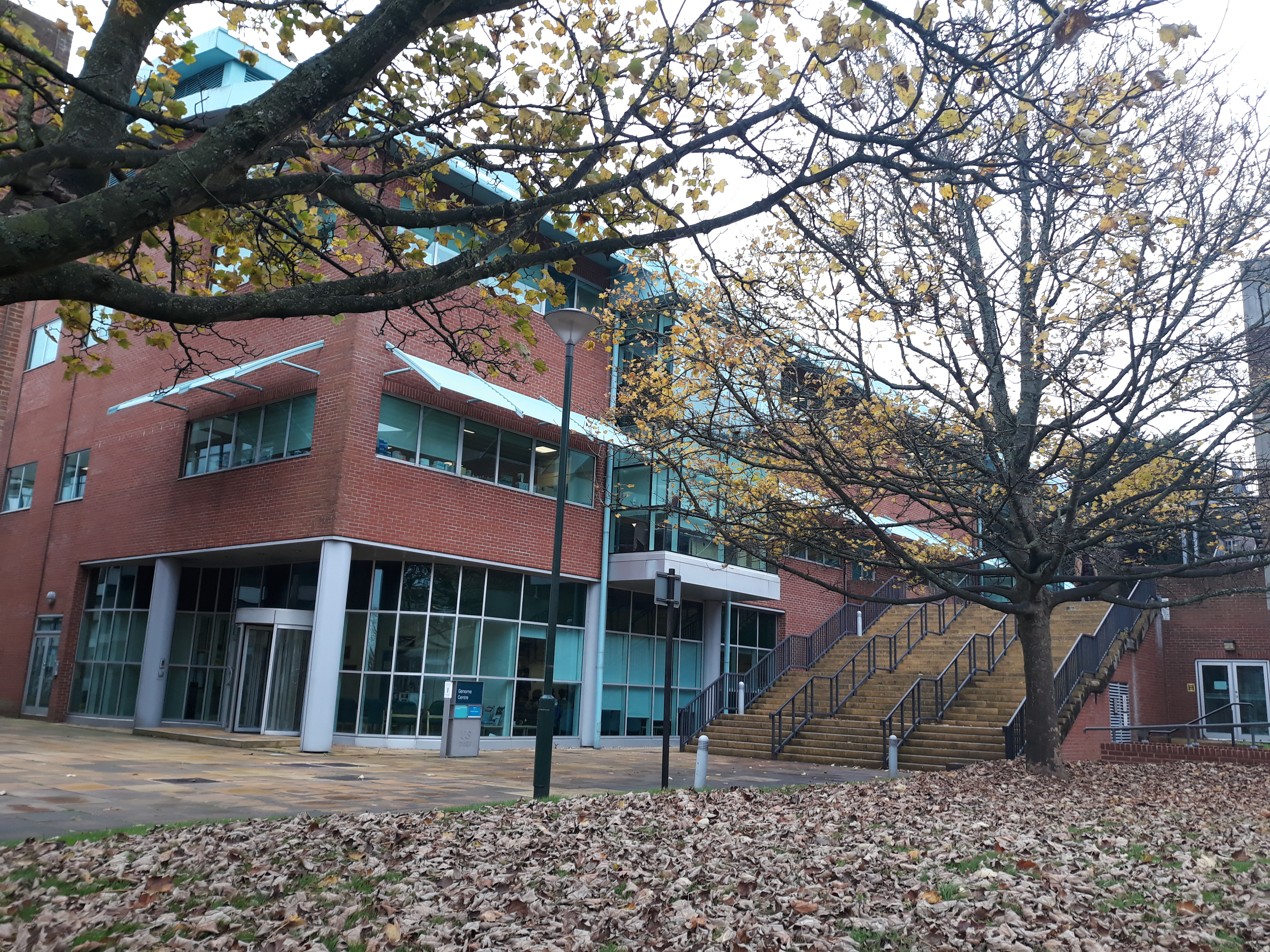
The Sussex Genome Centre

The university is one of the UK ESRC's 21 Centres for Doctoral Training, the only institutions accredited in 2010 and capable of receiving ESRC doctoral studentships and funding. The system was updated in 2016 and Doctoral Training Partnerships were established to replace the DTC. In this respect, Sussex is now a member of the Consortium of the Humanities and the Arts-South East England (CHASE) and the South East Network for Social Sciences.

The results of the Research Excellence Framework 2014 show that 98% of research activity at Sussex is categorised as 'world-leading' (28%), 'internationally excellent' (48%) or 'internationally recognised' (22%) in terms of originality, significance and rigour.

Sussex has a number of research collaborations with other Higher Education institutions as well as governmental and non-governmental organisations and institutes around the world. For example, the Harvard Sussex program is a long-standing research collaboration between Sussex and Harvard University focusing on public policy towards chemical and biological weapons. The CBW Conventions Bulletin is a quarterly newsletter published by the HSP. Sussex-Cornell Partnership, the Sussex-Bocconi-Renmin Intrapreneurship Hub and the Sussex-Lund Partnership in Middle Eastern and North African Studies are recent examples. Sussex also co-coordinates the Consortium for the Humanities and the Arts. Sussex is also one of the eight universities of the Tyndall Centre network.

In Europe, Sussex is one of the collaborating institutions of the Paul Scherrer Institute, the largest research institute in Switzerland, focusing on issues of technology and the natural sciences. Sussex is involved with many projects with the EU and with European countries. For example, BAR research is an Anglo-French collaboration between the Sussex, the East Sussex County Council and three French universities.

Nationally, Sussex is involved in a number of partnerships including the Nexus Network (A partnership between Sussex, University of Cambridge and the University of East Anglia) and CIED (a collaboration between Sussex, Oxford University and University of Manchester). The university is also a partner of the Metropolitan Police, with Demos (UK think tank) and Palantir Technologies.

In recent years, the institutes for the study of consciousness science, Centre for Advanced International Theory (CAIT), the institute for the study of corruption and the Middle East studies institute were opened at the university. The university also has a Genome Damage and Stability Centre, a nuclear magnetic resonance facility and a purpose-built apparatus in cryogenic research.

In terms of policy, Sussex is highly involved with the UK government, the UN and governments around the world. For example, the university is a UN Habitat partner. Nationally, the UK Trade Policy Observatory was set up at the university to offer the UK government, the UK industry as well as the public advice in addressing trade issues resulting from Brexit. The university is also one of the UK government's partner institutions on the Arctic Research Program. Similarly, SPRU and IDS are involved in policy recommendations with countries on all five continents.

In 2016, the Transformative Innovation Policy Consortium (TIPC) was set up as a collaboration between the university and the governments of Sweden, Norway, Finland, South Africa and Colombia to research social and economic issues.

The university is also home to a number of academic journals from the IDS Bulletin to The Journal of Ethnic and Migration Studies (JEMS), Journal of Experimental Psychopathology, The World Trade Review, Journal of Banking and Finance, International Journal of Innovation Management, Journal of International Humanitarian Legal Studies, European Journal of International Relations and the Child and Family Social Work Journal, among many others.

=== Admissions ===
UCAS Admission Statistics
	2025	2024	2023	2022	2021
Applications (Note: Main scheme applications, International and UK)	16,825	18,690	21,840	21,750	21,185
Accepted	3,280	3,495	4,185	5,145	5,020
Applications/Accepted Ratio	5.1	5.3	5.2	4.2	4.2
Overall Offer Rate (%)	90.8	92.2	92.1	92.8	92.5
↳ UK only (%) (Note: UK domiciled applicants)	92.5	93.3	93.6	92.9	92.2
Average Entry Tariff	—N/a	—N/a	—N/a	132	133
↳ Top three exams (Note: The maximum tariff score for three exams is 168: the equivalent of A*A*A* at A-Level, 777 at HL for the IB Diploma Programme, or AAA at Advanced Higher)	—N/a	—N/a	117.5	123.3	125.9

HESA Student Body Composition (2024/25)
Domicile and Ethnicity	Total
British White (Note: Not be confused solely with White British)	52%
British Ethnic Minorities (Note: Includes those who indicate that they identify as Asian, Black, Mixed Heritage, Arab or any other ethnicity except White.)	22%
International EU	3%
International Non-EU	23%
Undergraduate Widening Participation Indicators
Female	54%
Independent School	10%
Low Participation Areas (Note: Calculated from the Polar4 measure, using Quintile1, in England and Wales. Calculated from the Scottish Index of Multiple Deprivation (SIMD) measure, using SIMD20, in Scotland.)	10%

In the 2024/25 academic year, the student body consisted of 17,290 students, composed of 12,920 undergraduates and 4,375 postgraduate students. The university is consistently designated as a 'medium-tariff' institution by the Department for Education, with the average undergraduate entrant to the university in recent years amassing between 117–126 UCAS Tariff points in their top three pre-university qualifications – the equivalent of BBC to ABB at A-Level. Based on 2022/23 HESA entry standards data published in domestic league tables, which include a broad range of qualifications beyond the top three exam grades, the average student at the University of Sussex achieved 132 points.

According to the 2023 Times and Sunday Times Good University Guide, approximately 11% of Sussex's undergraduates come from independent schools.

=== Educational partners ===
Brighton and Sussex Medical School (BSMS) results from a partnership between the University of Brighton and the University of Sussex. The school, the first medical school in the South East outside London, gained its licence in 2002 and opened in 2003. The Guardian ranked the medical school as 16th in the UK in 2018.

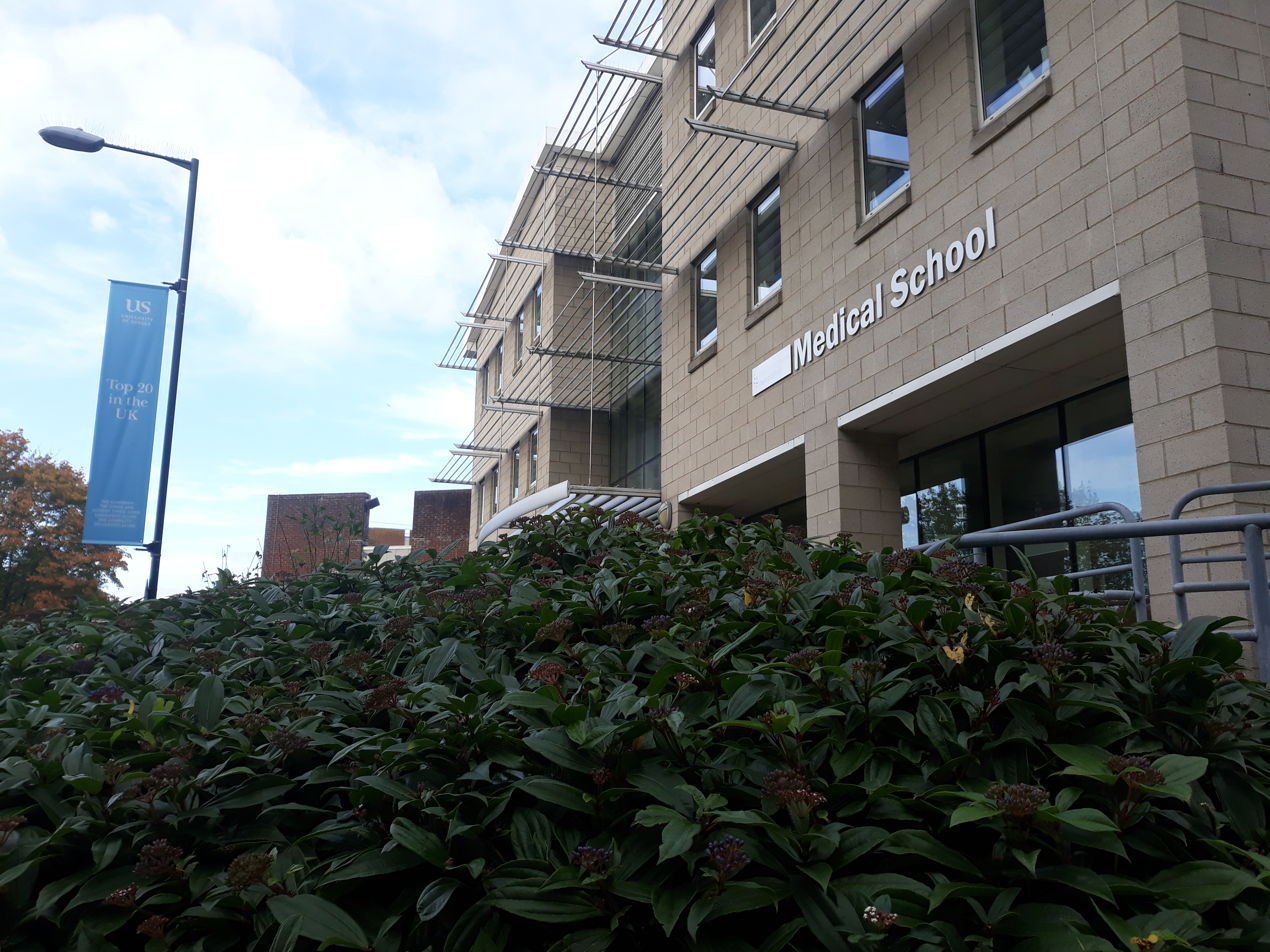
BSMS building

The Institute of Development Studies offers research, teaching and communications related to international development. IDS originated in 1966 as a research institute based at the university. It is financially and constitutionally independent under the status of a charitable company limited by guarantee.

The Centre for Research in Innovation Management, a research-based school of the University of Brighton, dates from 1990. It was located in the Freeman Centre building but has now moved to the University of Brighton campus.

The Sussex Innovation Centre, an on-campus commercial business centre, opened in 1996. It provides services for the formation and growth of technology- and knowledge-based companies in the South East. It offers a business environment to over 40 companies in the IT, biotech, media and engineering sectors.

Nationally, the university has a number of partner institutions across the UK including Bellerbys College, British and Irish Modern Music Institute (BIMM), University Centre Croydon (UCC, also known as Croydon College), Highbury College Portsmouth, International Study Centre (Study Group), Roffey Park Institute, University of Brighton and West Dean College. These partnerships include both validated courses (designed and delivered by the partner institution but awarded and quality assured by the university) and franchised courses (designed and assessed by the university, but delivered by another institution).

Study Group works in partnership with the university to provide the University of Sussex International Study Centre (ISC). It offers a course of academic subjects, study skills and English-language training for students who wish to study a degree at the university but who do not yet possess the necessary qualifications to start a degree. The ISC course provides students with English-language and academic skills to start at Sussex the following year. In 2018, ISC announced that they will increase their postgraduate and undergraduate offerings by adding 50 new courses across the pre-masters and pathway options on offer.

The British and Irish Modern Music Institute offers BA courses in Modern Musicianship – validated by the university – at its centres in London, Berlin, Hamburg, Brighton, Manchester, Bristol and Birmingham.

Internationally, the university has over 160 partner institutions including the University of British Columbia, University of California, George Washington University, Georgetown University, University of Massachusetts Amherst, University of Michigan Ann Arbor, University of North Carolina Chapel Hill, University of North Carolina at Asheville, University of Pittsburgh, Purdue University, University of Rochester, State University of New York, University of Texas at Austin, University of Washington, Kyoto University, Peking University, Korea University, National Taiwan University (NTU), Université Grenoble Alpes, Aix-Marseille Université, Paris-Sorbonne University, Sciences Po Aix, Sciences Po Paris, University of Strasbourg, Freie Universität Berlin, Humboldt-Universität zu Berlin and LMU Munich. These are institutions where there are formal agreements for student exchange, research collaborations, staff and faculty mobility and study abroad schemes.

== Student life ==
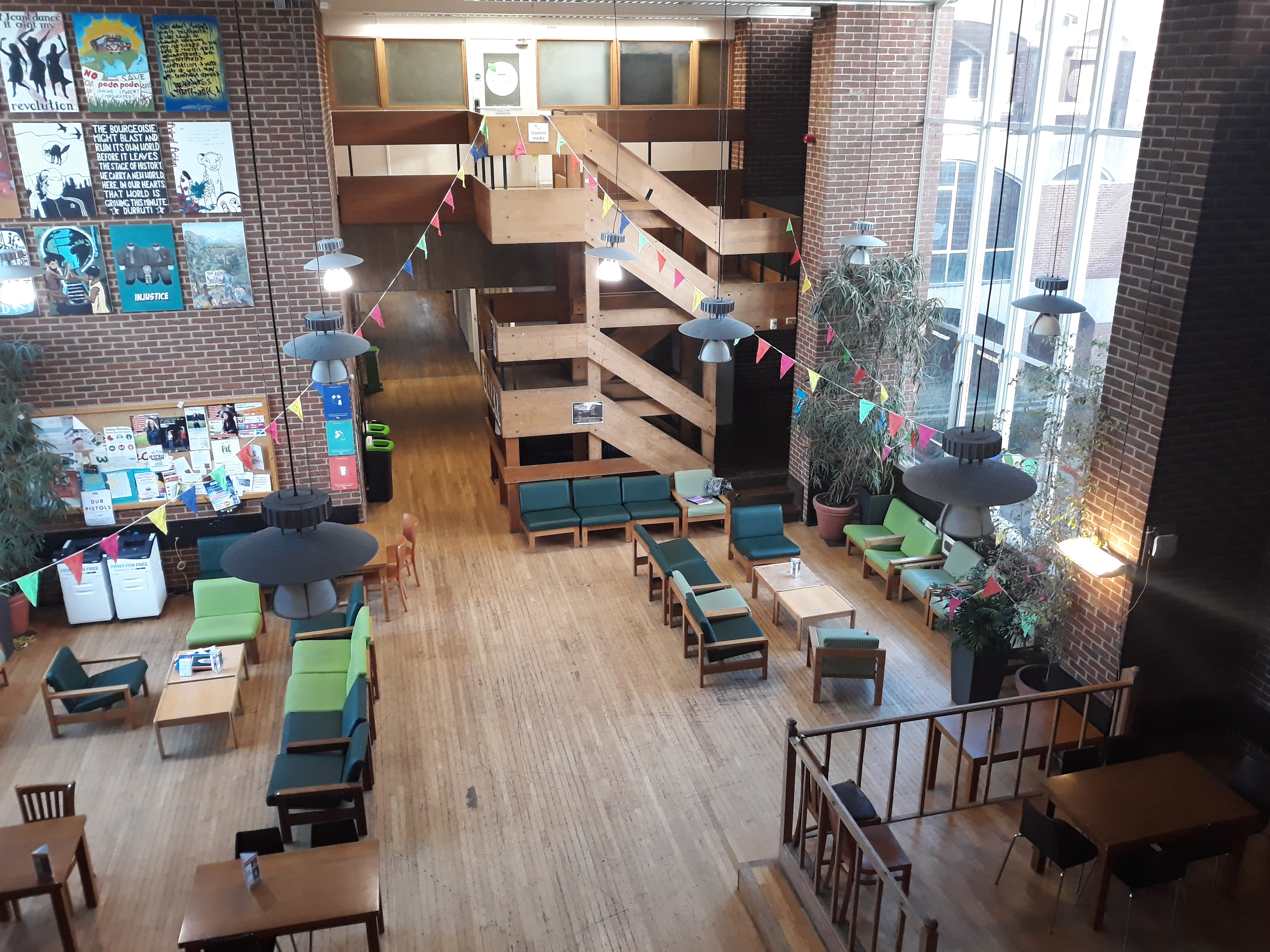
Sussex Student Union common room

=== University of Sussex Students' Union ===
Sussex Students Union is the main body responsible for the representation of Sussex students. It runs two bars (Falmer Bar, which once hosted bands such as The Who, and Northfield Bar), two shops, a cafe and a number of other outlets and schemes (such as the buddy scheme). There are 261 student clubs and societies at Sussex, all functioning under the Student Union.

Like many campus universities, many of the students studying at Sussex live in the city. Students are highly involved in Brighton's life, from its cultural scene to community service. In 2016, Sussex won the AGCAS award for Student engagement.

In 2017, Sussex was ranked as top in the UK for political scene (tied with Cambridge, Oxford, Manchester, Goldsmith and LSE).

=== Student support ===
A wide range of support is offered by the university, with key student support services (e.g. financial, counselling, careers, exceptional circumstances, disability support) offered via the Student Centre, which replaced the Student Life Centre in 2022. The building also acts as a hub for a wide range of student opportunities, such as employer fairs, academic skills workshops and wellbeing- and community-building activities.

All students at Sussex have access to a wide variety of Careers and employability support, in addition to the opportunities embedded in their degree programme. The Spirit of Sussex Award also encourages students to build their employability by recognising and recording their co-curricular achievements and skills.

=== Access and participation initiatives ===
Like most UK Universities, Sussex deliver a number of initiatives to improve equality of opportunity for home-fees students from underrepresented backgrounds to access and succeed in undergraduate higher education. These are delivered by teams including Widening Participation, who work with local schools and colleges, and many teams within the Student Experience division.

The university was previously known for its First-Generation Scholars scheme, an award-winning initiative to support students from lower-economic backgrounds and those who are the first to pursue higher education in their families. In 2017, Britain's Labour Party leader Jeremy Corbyn met some First-Generation Scholar students during his visit to the university. More recently, the Sussex Access Programme supports students from a diverse range of backgrounds including mature students, care-experienced and estranged students, and many others.

=== Student research ===
At undergraduate level, Sussex runs a Junior Researcher scheme in which undergraduate students can receive funding and spend 8 weeks during their summer vacation doing research alongside Sussex researchers and academics. Additionally, a number of independent bursaries for undergraduates to conduct research projects exist within Schools and research centres. In parallel, a competitive International Junior researcher scheme exists to allow students from Sussex's institutional partners, such as Georgetown University, The Chinese University of Hong Kong, and the University of California, Santa Cruz to receive funding and come to Sussex to work on research projects alongside researchers and academics. Additionally, a number of research groups and networks incorporate advanced undergraduate students into their projects offering them the opportunity to both shadow and actively participate in ongoing research at the university.

At postgraduate level, Sussex offers MA, MS, MRes, PGCert, PGDip, CLNDIP and LLM degrees. All master's degrees are research based and master's students are incorporated with PhD students in the different research centres, clusters and networks across the university and many master's degrees are based in research centres instead of being based in University departments. Further, student research mobility schemes are in place to allow students to conduct research at other institutions across the world. The university has a number of research-oriented funding schemes (scholarships and fellowships) for master's students, including a Sussex Graduate Scholarship for current undergraduate students at the university. There are also country scholarships for postgraduate students applying from India, Nigeria, Pakistan, Malaysia and Vietnam.

=== International students and opportunities ===
In 2023–24, there were 17,765 students at Sussex, with just under 14,000 undergraduates and 4,000 postgraduates. In total, there are around 5,500 students from outside the UK, the majority of whom are postgraduates. One in five of its undergraduates study abroad at some point of their education: the majority of its undergraduate courses offer a study abroad year and/or placement.

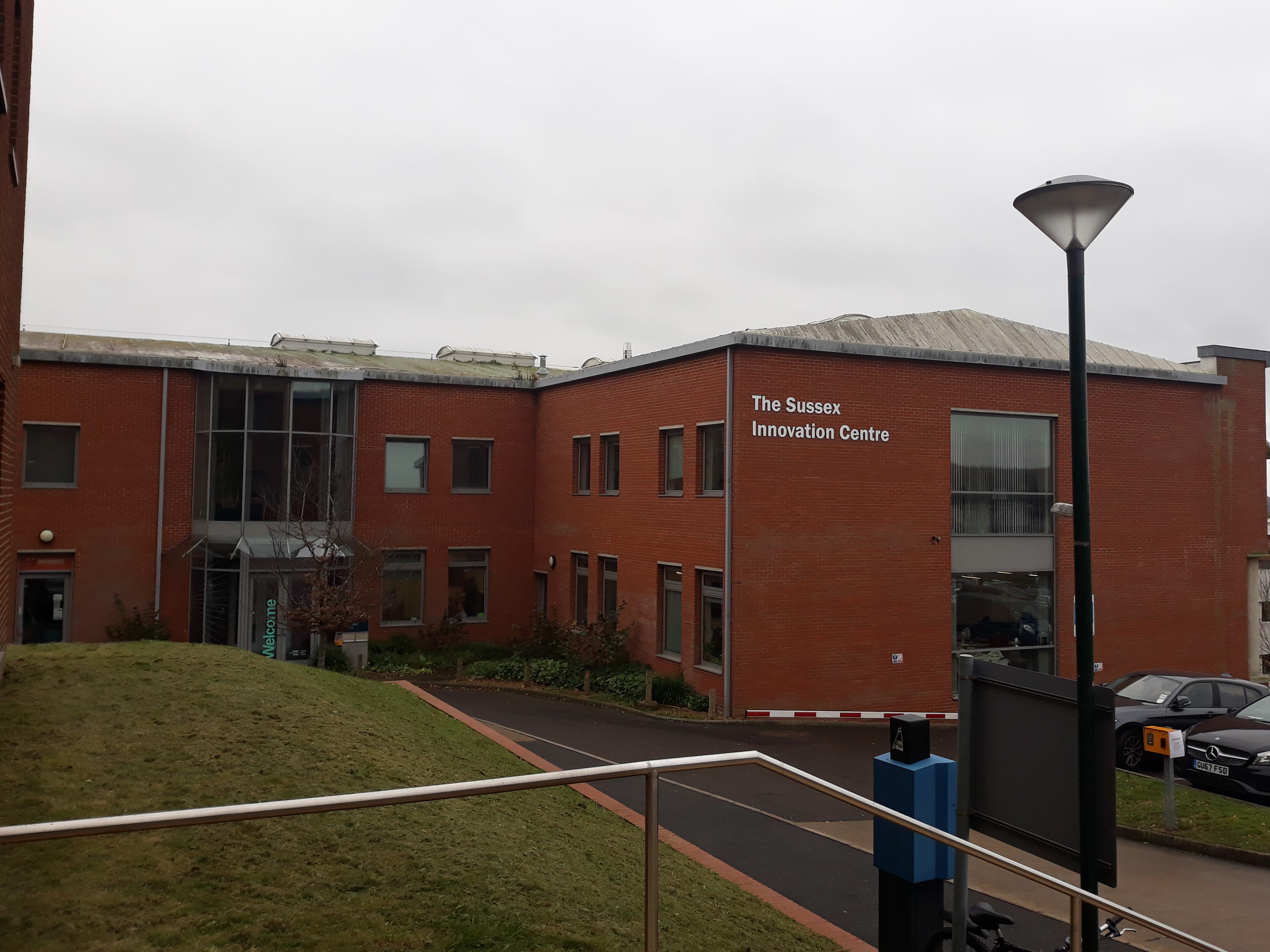
The Sussex Innovation Centre

Sussex students may also spend a year abroad as part of their degree, in a variety of European institutions through the Erasmus+ programme, as well as North America, Asia, Central and South America, Australia and North Africa.

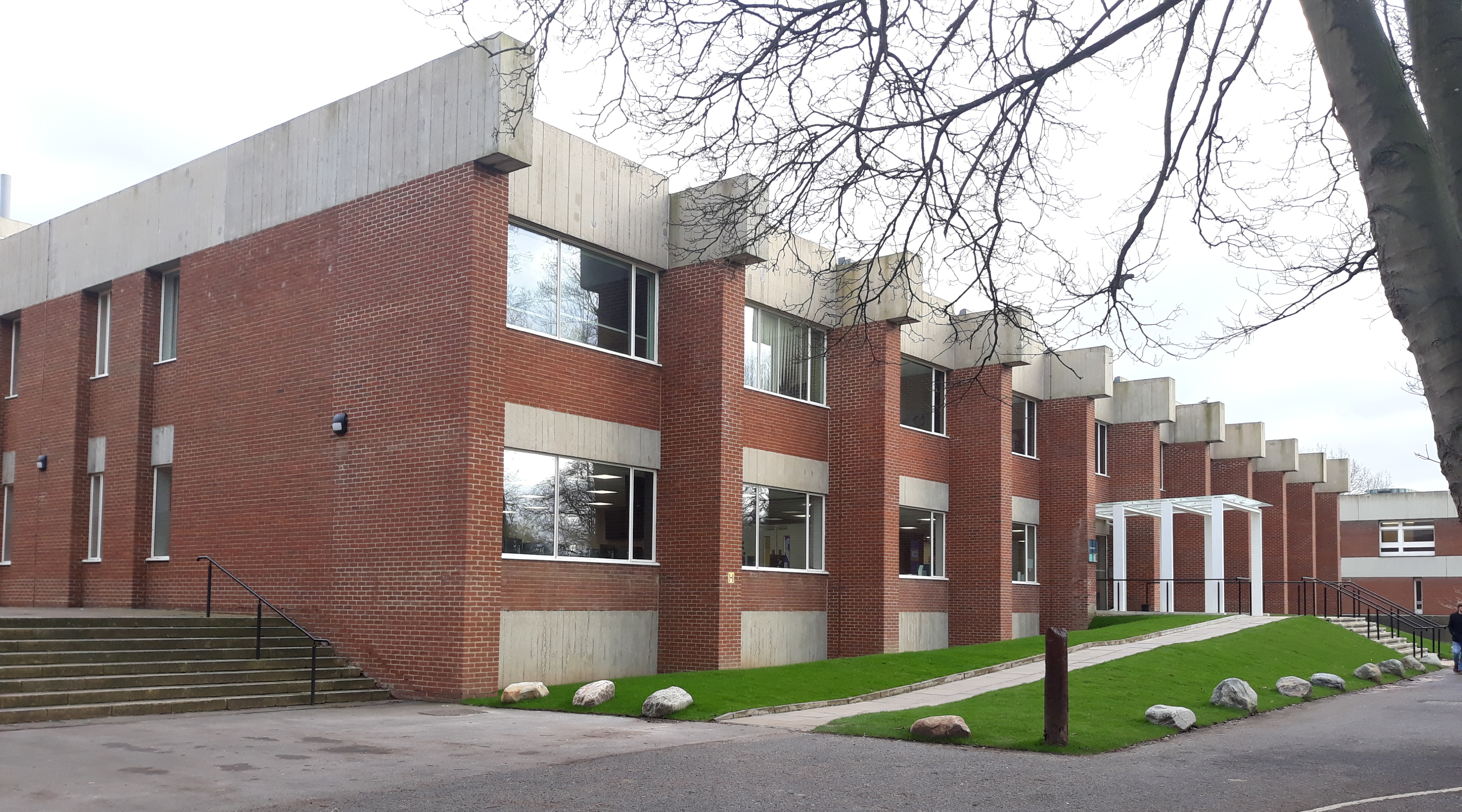
Chichester 1 building that houses the Engineering department

English Language courses for speakers of other languages are provided by the Language Institute. "English in the Vacation" gives intensive practice in spoken and written English. An International Foundation Year offered by the ISC (Sussex University International Study Centre) offers direct routes to Sussex degrees.

The Sussex International Summer School runs for four and eight weeks starting in July, providing intensive courses. It is predominantly attended by foreign students. The ISS trips office provides excursions to prominent cities, theatres, and activities. Sussex is also home to the Fulbright Sussex Summer institute, a four-week academic program on British culture designed for American Students.

The International Study Centre, run by Study Group International at Sussex offers international Foundation courses, pre-masters and an International Year 1 scheme to prepare students for their degrees. The centre also offers a "Pre-masters" degree for international students.

The Sussex Student Union also runs a series of events in support of international students at Sussex. The union has a Boycott, Divestment and Sanctions policy in all its shops, bars and cafes.

=== Housing ===
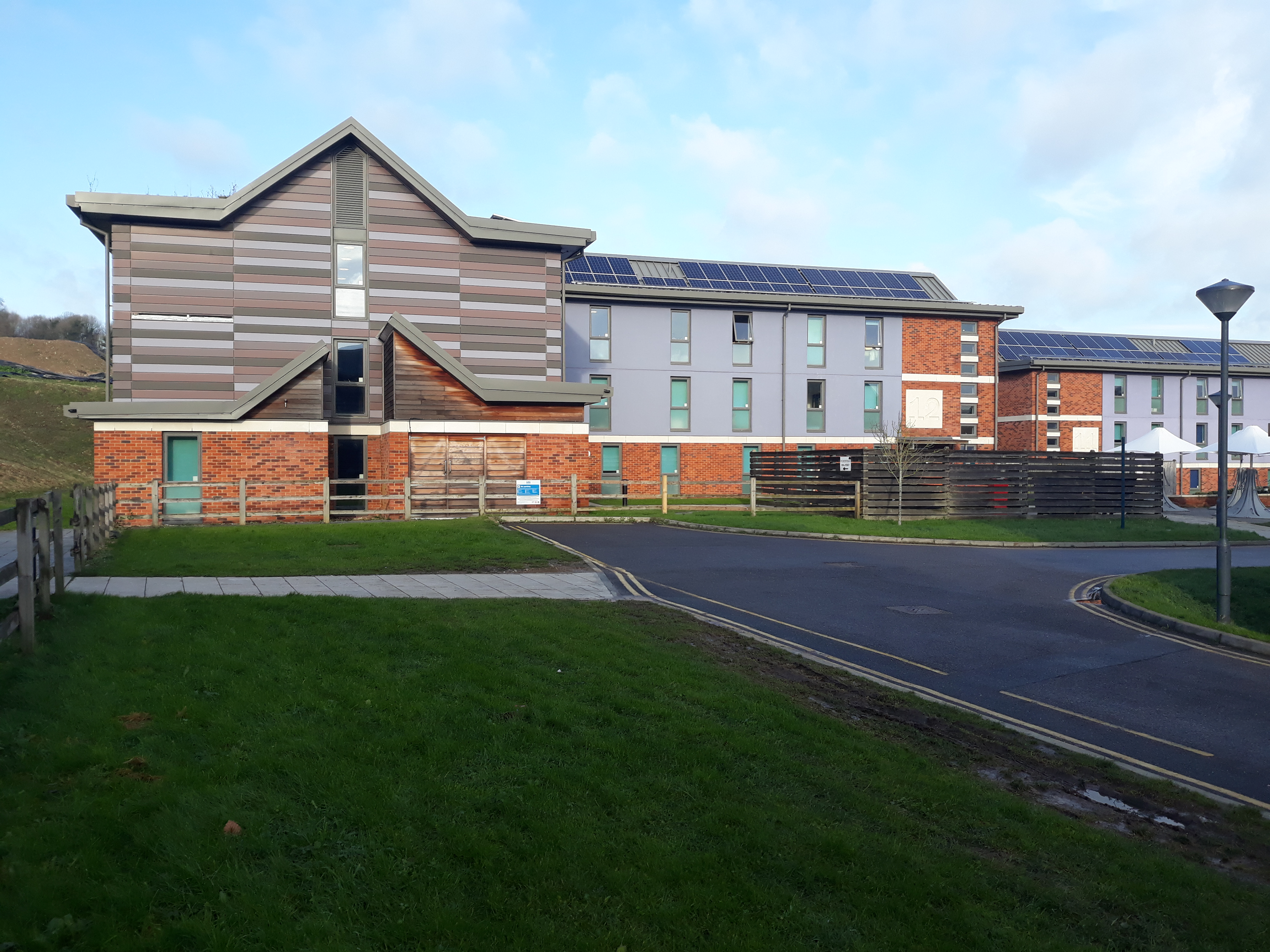
Northfield

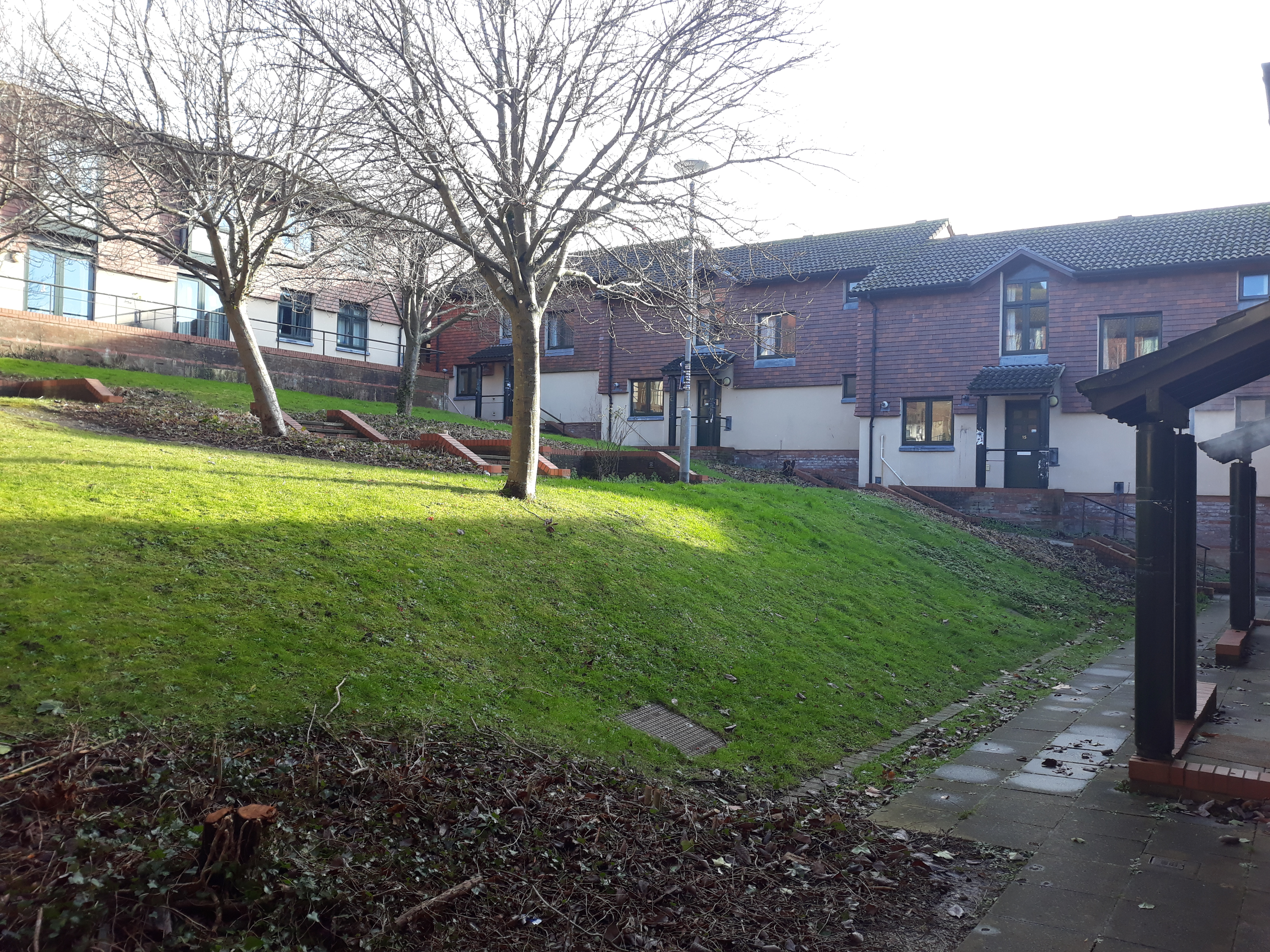
Brighthelm

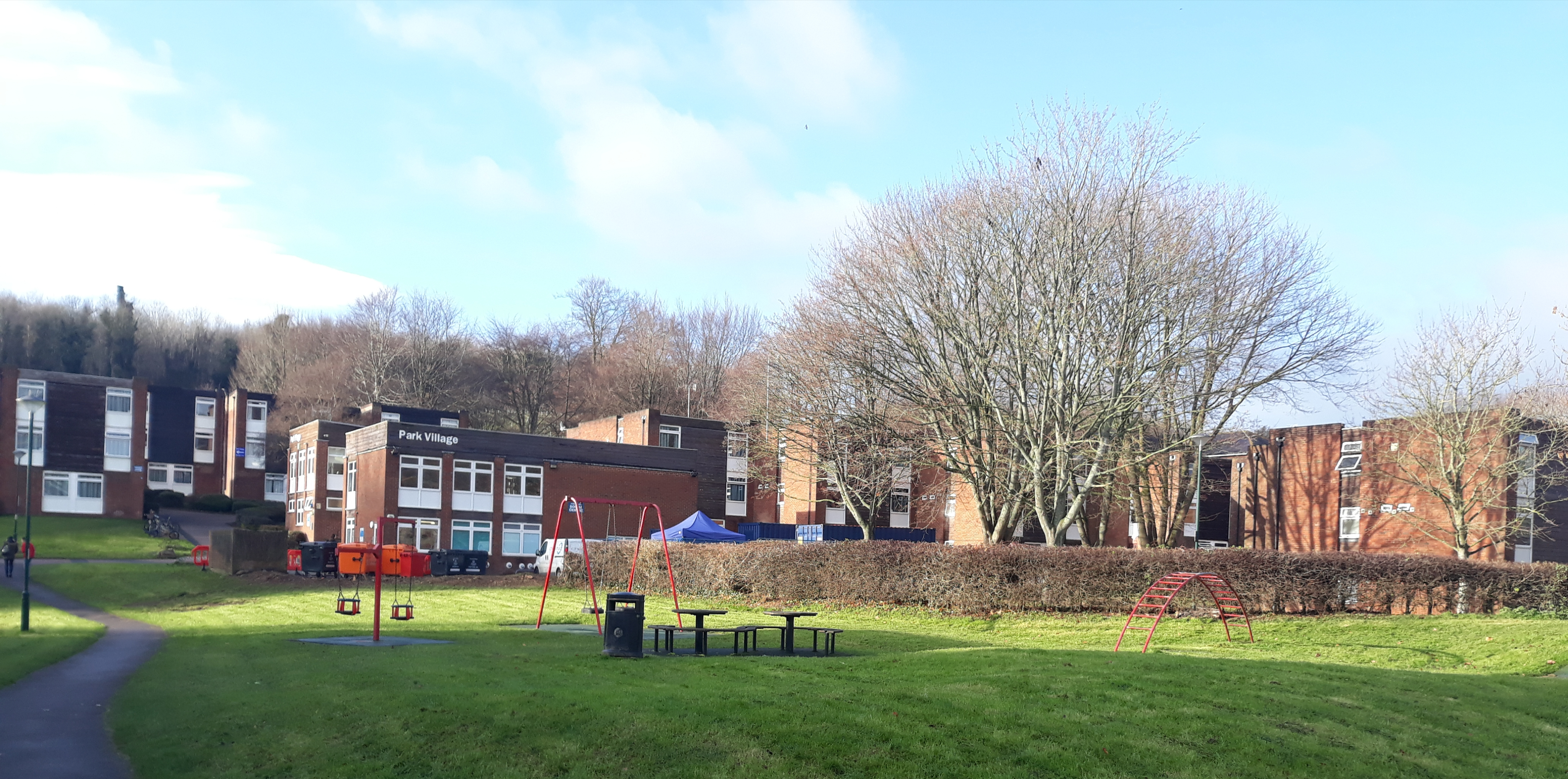
Park Village

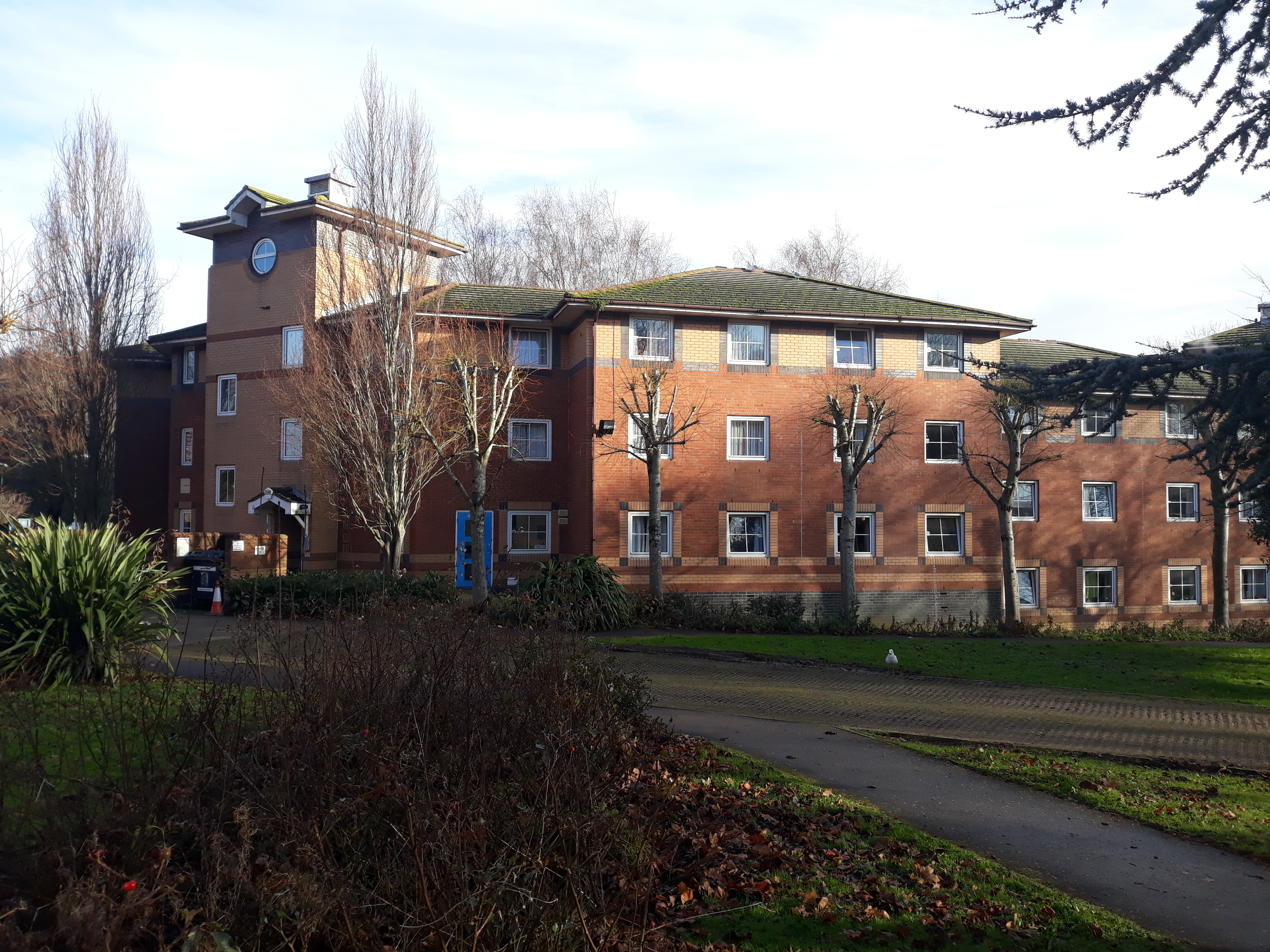
Lewes Court

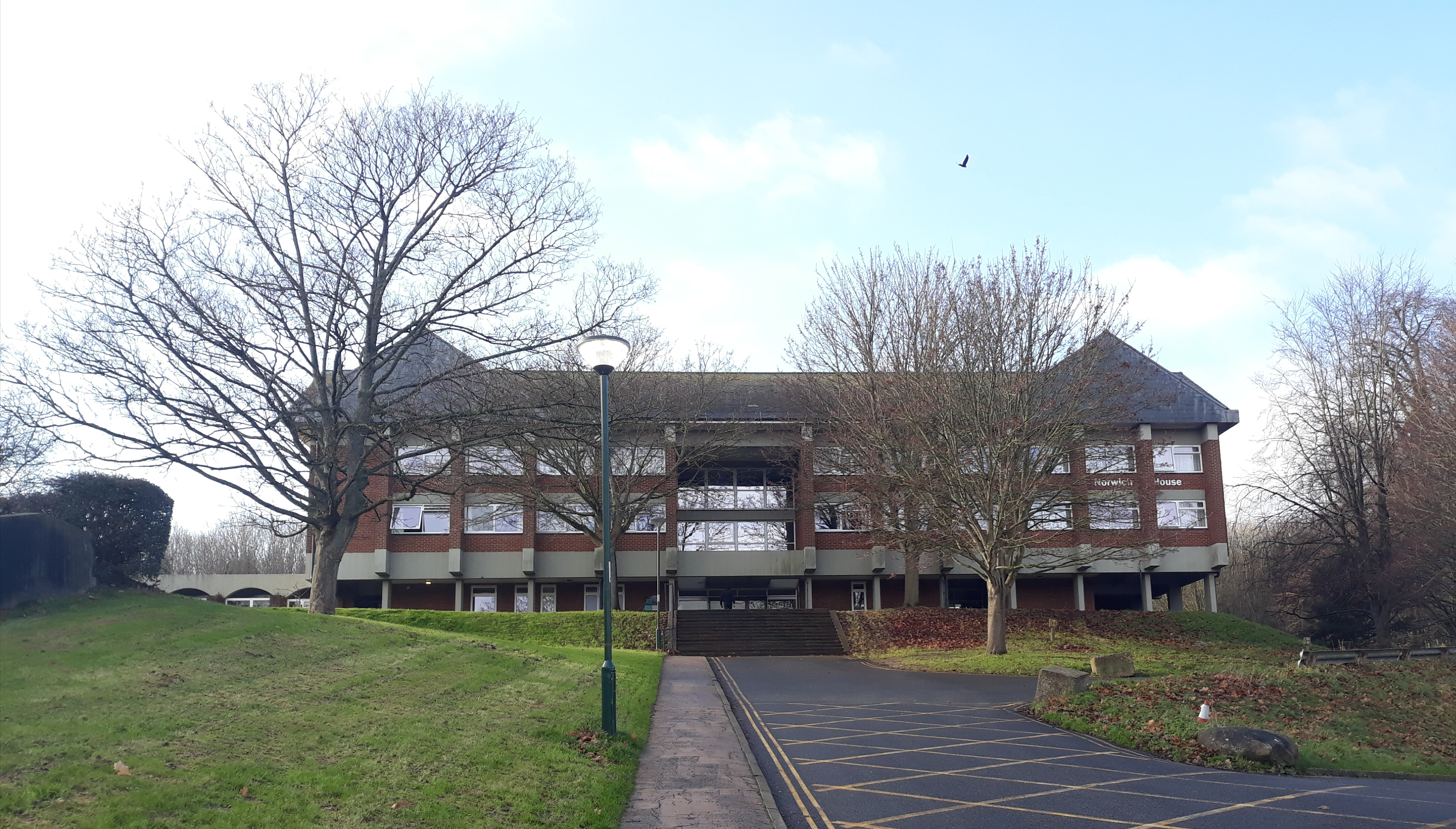
Norwich House

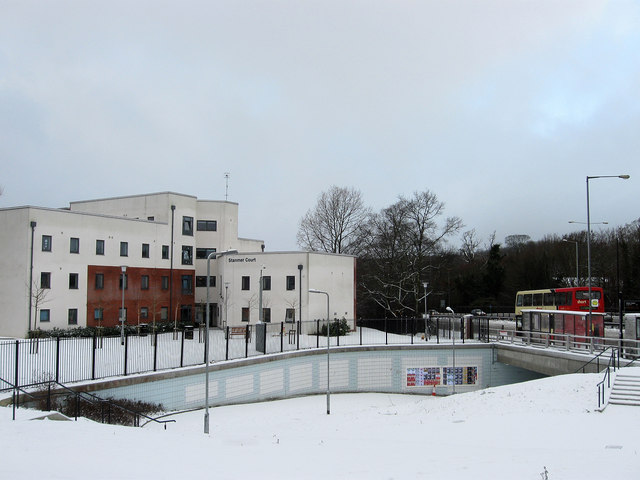
Stanmer Court

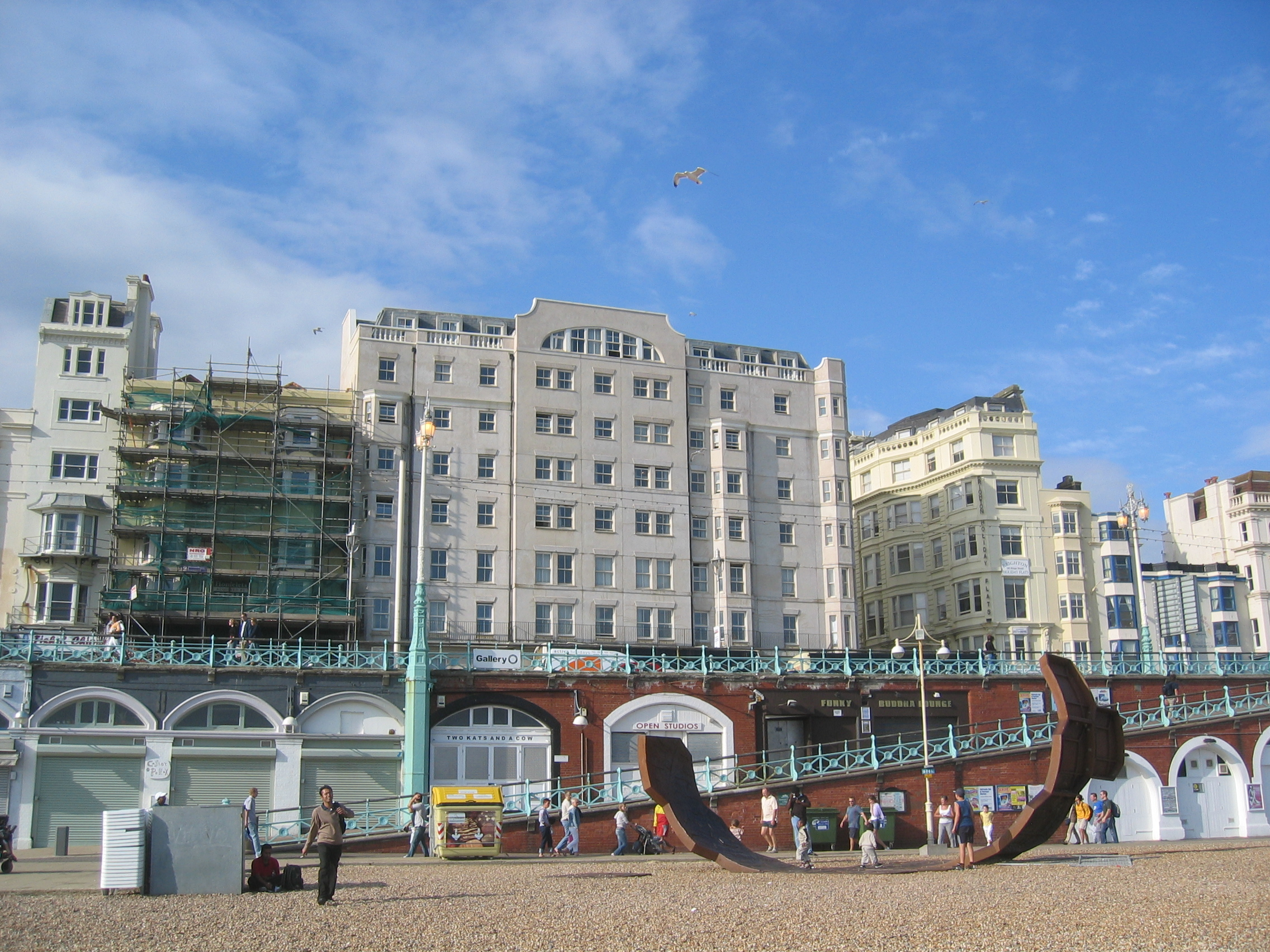
King's Road

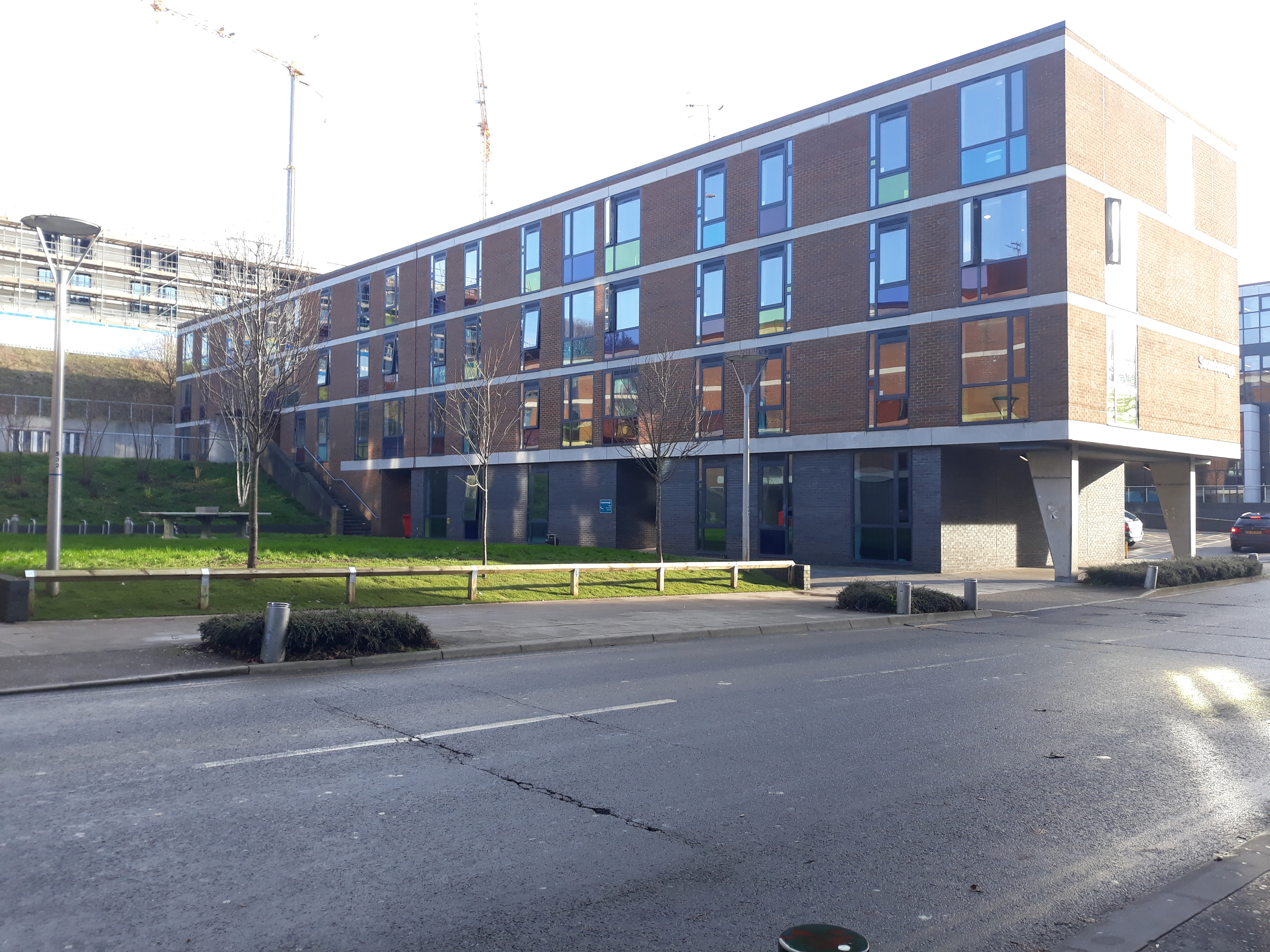
Swanborough

Overall, there are nine on-campus university managed accommodations, one off-campus university managed block of flats, one off-campus university managed study lodge and a number of university houses within Brighton and Hove. Around 5000 undergraduate and postgraduate students live in University-managed accommodation, but many live in private accommodation or with family members.

After the initial campus opening, accommodation on campus was expanded in the 1970s with the construction of Kulukundis House, for students with physical disabilities, and the unusual split-level flats of East Slope, a development that included a social building with a porter's office and bar. Two newer accommodation areas were completed in the 2000s: one next to Falmer railway station, named Stanmer Court, and the other next to East Slope, opposite Bramber House, known as Swanborough. Northfield was constructed at the top end of campus, beyond Lewes Court, and opened in September 2011. In 2017, the old East Slope buildings were demolished to create up to date accommodation (also called East Slope) and a new Student Centre, which opened in phases between 2021 and 2022

In 2020, the university announced that they plan to replace Park Village and Park Houses (excluding Norwich House) with the new West Slope development, as well as creating new facilities including a new library, cafe, supermarket, additional study spaces, and flexible green space. The first phase is projected to be completed by autumn 2022 and this work is projected to be fully completed by 2025. The new accommodation will provide approximately 1000 additional bedrooms. The university's Sustainability Action Plan released in June 2021 includes plans for increasing the energy efficiency of campus housing and ancillary facilities in an effort to reach net zero by 2035. The plan includes upgrading building energy management systems by August 2022 and assessing if the BREEAM Excellent environmental construction standards are sufficient for new construction by December 2022.

=== Sport ===
The university has two sports centres on its campus: the Sussex Sports Centre and the Falmer Sports Complex. There is also one sports shop within the sports centre and one in the Falmer sports complex. The Falmer sports centre alone has over 40 acres of playing field. The university also has agreements with Freedom Leisure, granting its students access to sports centres across West Sussex.

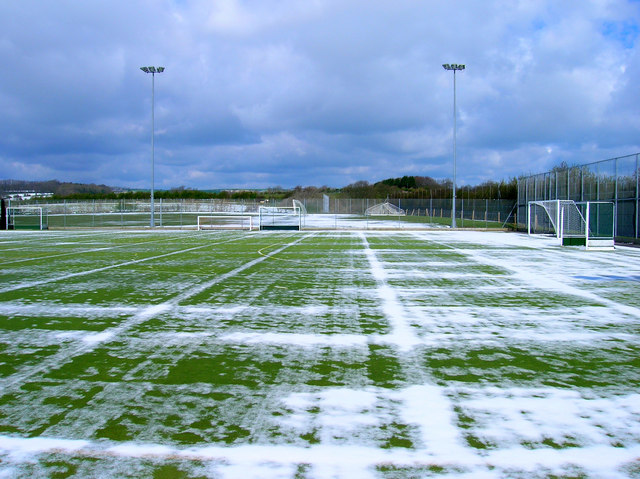
Floodlit 3G pitch

The university competes in the following sports, usually with both men's and women's teams:

- Team sports: basketball, cricket, football, field hockey, lacrosse, netball, American football, rugby union, ultimate Frisbee, rowing, and volleyball.
- Racquet sports: tennis, table tennis, badminton, and squash.
- Individual sports: archery, fencing, swimming, and trampolining.
- Outdoor pursuits: sailing, mountain biking, mountaineering, skiing and snowboarding, sub aqua, surfing, and windsurfing.
- Martial arts: mixed martial arts, kickboxing, Shaolin Kung Fu, aikido, and sport aikido.

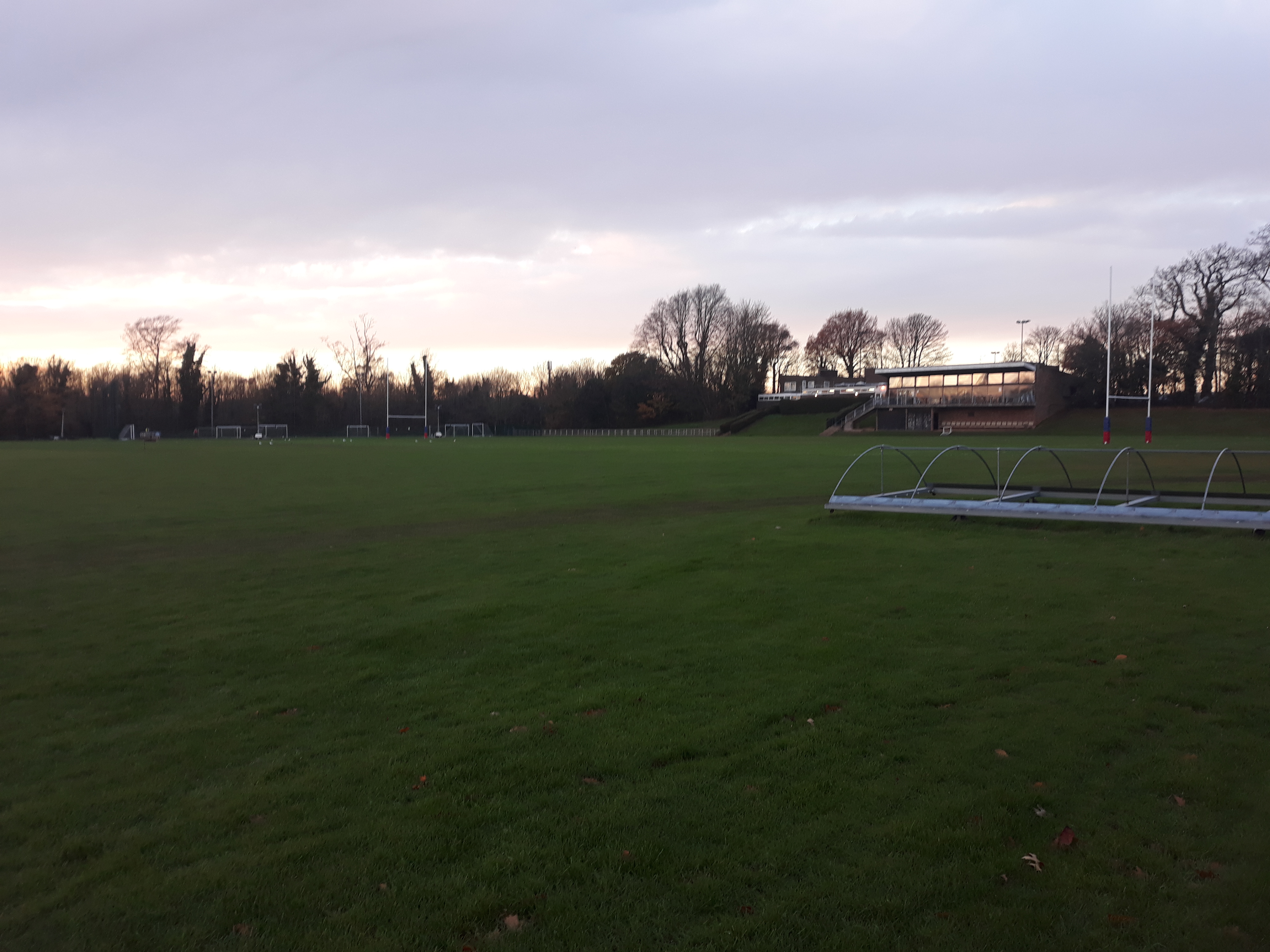
A section of the Sports fields

The Falmer Stadium, home to Brighton & Hove Albion F.C., is located near the Sussex campus. A mutual relationship of benefits, including potential usage of the stadium's sporting facilities by the university, was established very early on.

In 2018, the university had 42 sports teams competing in the BUCS.

The Sussex Sports centre also runs a number of courses, from Yoga to Cycling challenges, as well as fundraisers, children's activities and specialized workshops for students and staff. The university also offers sports scholarships, including ones for basketball and Hockey.

=== Campus media ===
University Radio Falmer (abbreviated to URF) is one of the first student radio stations in the country, founded in 1976. It now broadcasts via digital audio broadcasting and via the internet. The station is unplaylisted, and broadcasts twenty-four hours a day from its studio in the Grade I listed Falmer House. URF also publishes student articles, interviews and news on its website. It won a bronze award in the "best scripted programming" category in the 2008 UK Student Radio Awards. Alumni of the station include the former BBC Radio Director Helen Boaden, Sky News journalist Kit Bradshaw, and BBC News presenter Clive Myrie.

The Badger is the Union's fortnightly newspaper and is written and designed entirely by Sussex students. The paper is available to students and staff during term-time, covering news and sport on campus, as well as comment pieces, features, lifestyle and arts coverage. It also publishes content online. The Badger began in October 1995, having formerly been known as Unionews since the 1970s. The paper has since covered a variety of stories, including several on-campus occupations and the expulsion of five Sussex students for involvement in protests.

University of Sussex Student Television (abbreviated to UniTV) is a student television channel, launched in September 2010. UniTV is a member of NaSTA (National Student Television Association) and has won 7 NaSTA awards in the past three years.

== Notable people ==
=== Notable alumni ===
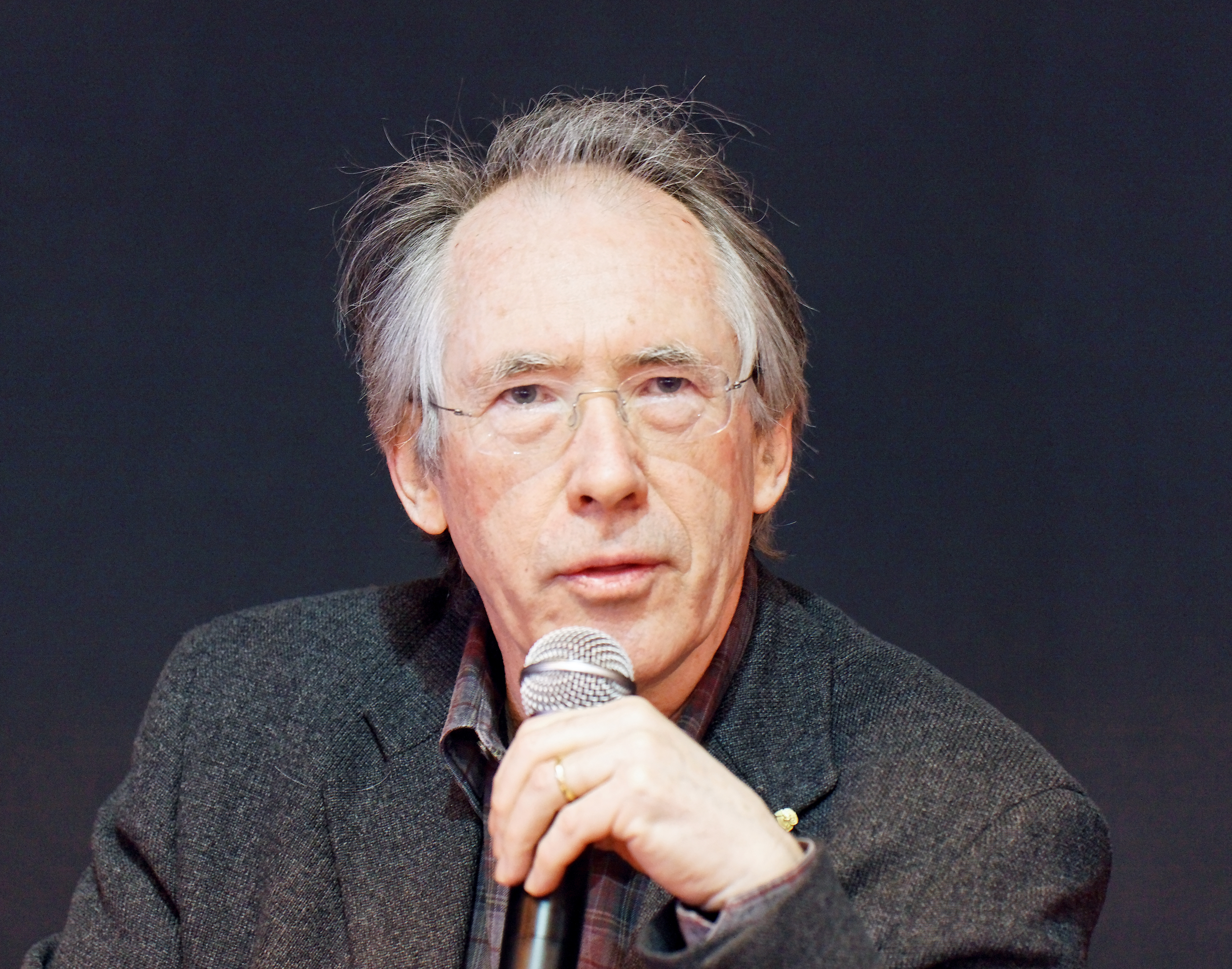
Ian McEwan, novelist and screenwriter

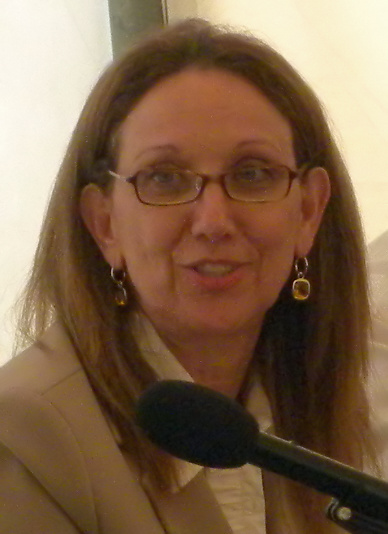
Rebeca Grynspan, Head of United Nations Development Programme and former Under-Secretary General of the UN

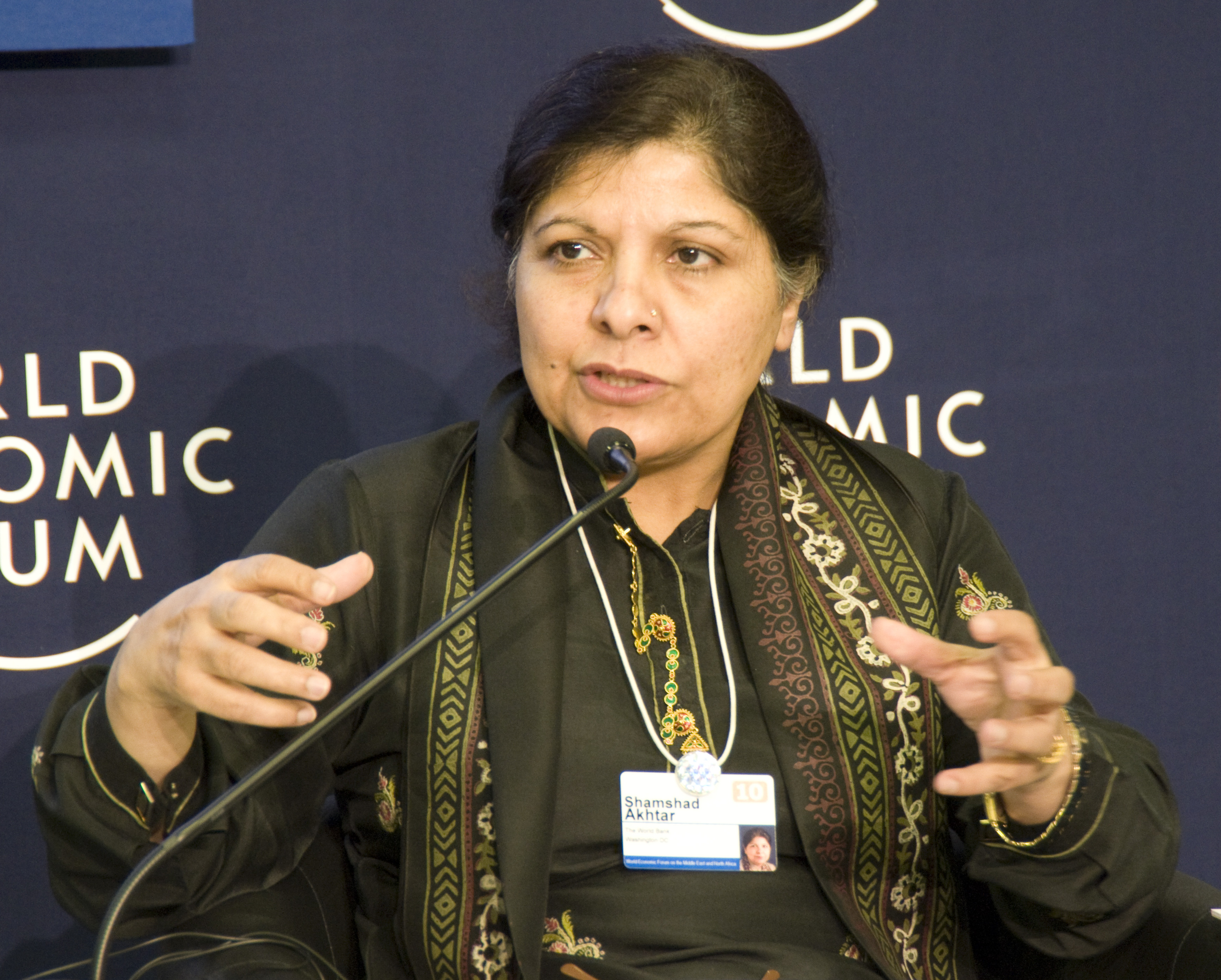
Shamshad Akhtar, Executive Secretary of United Nations Economic and Social Commission

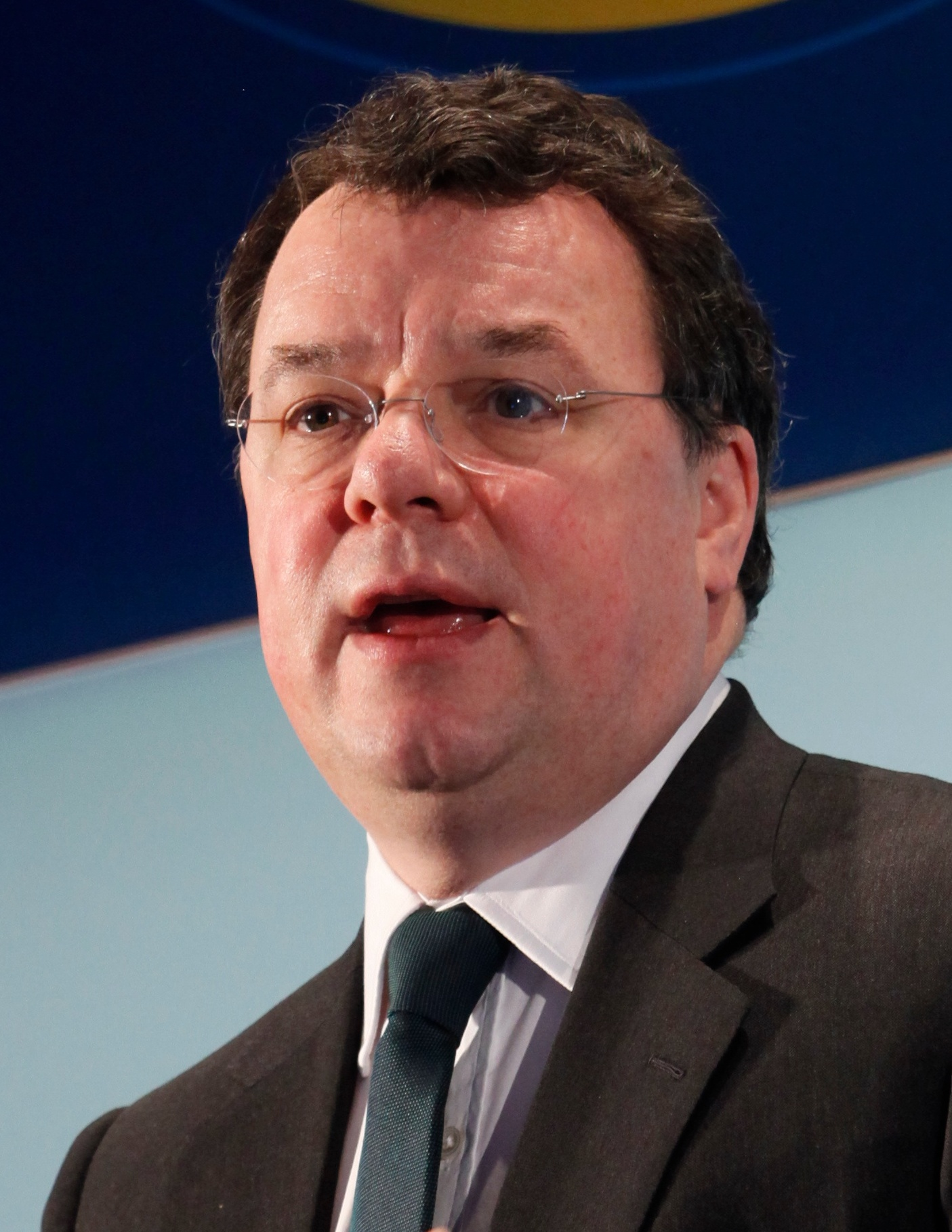
Sir Keith Skeoch, former CEO of Standard Life

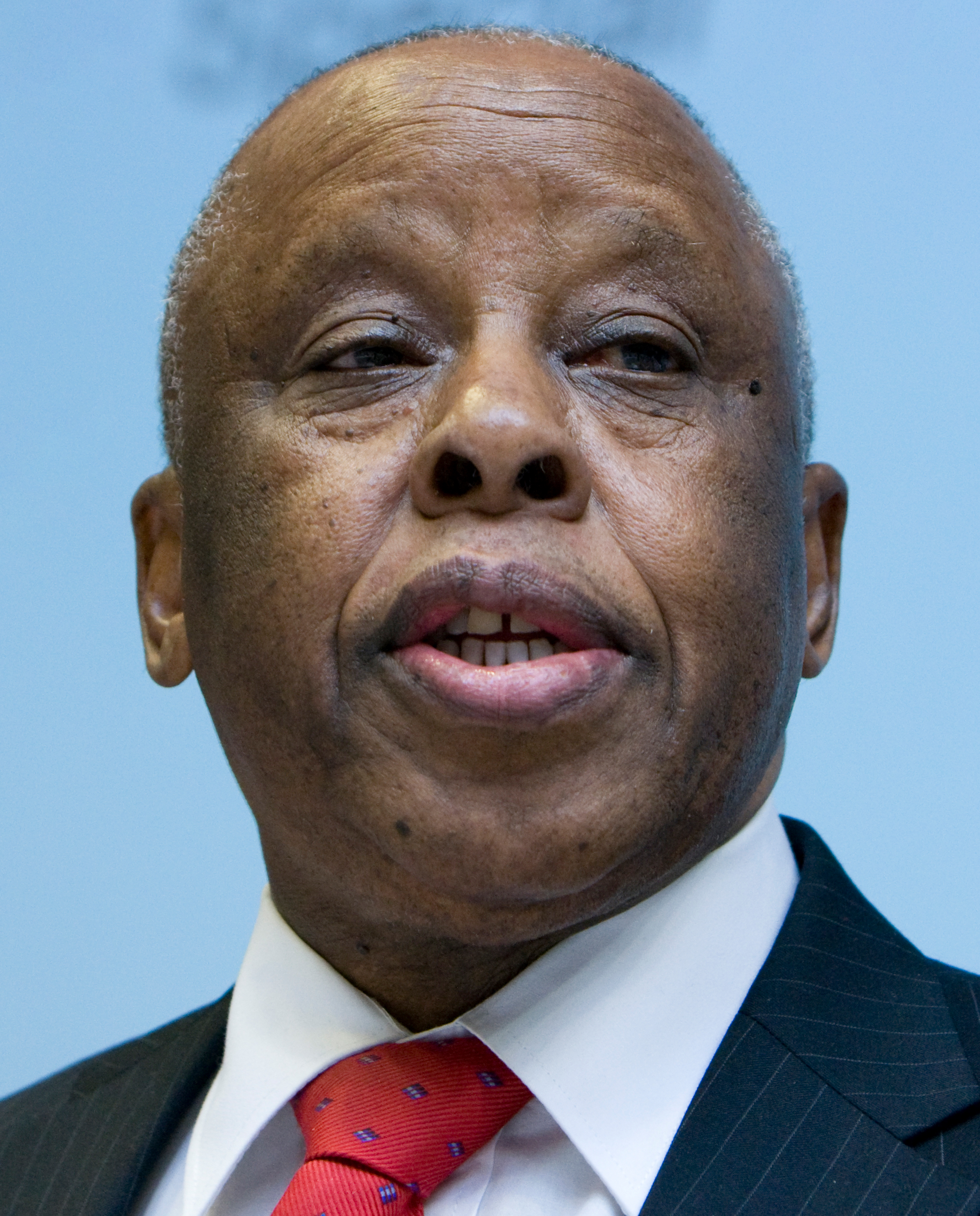
Festus Mogae, President of Botswana

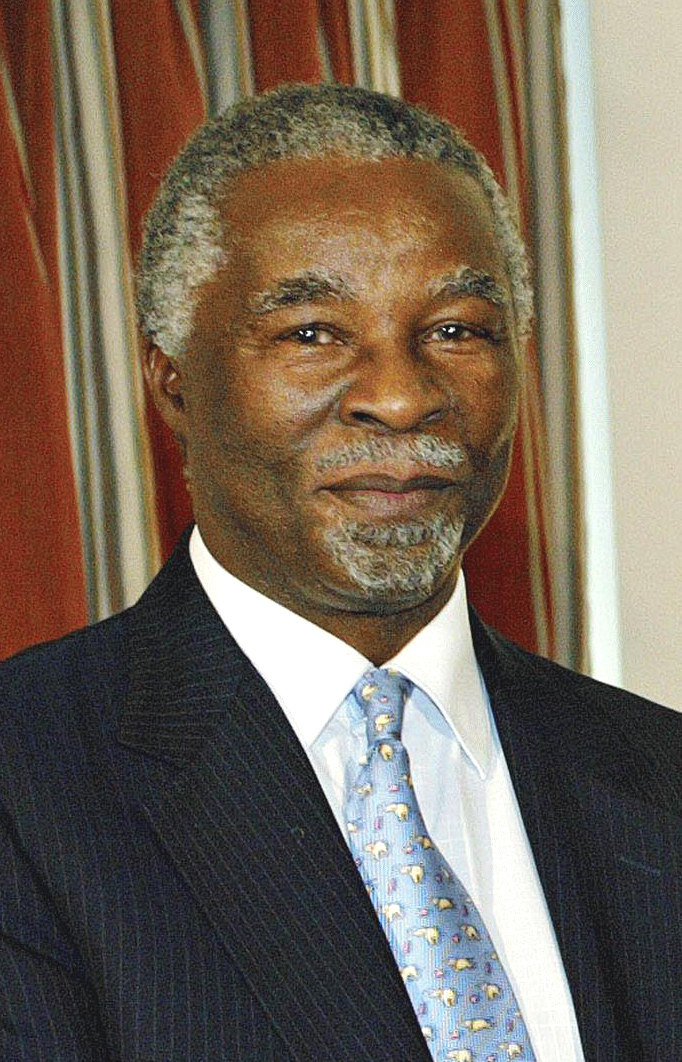
Thabo Mbeki, President of South Africa

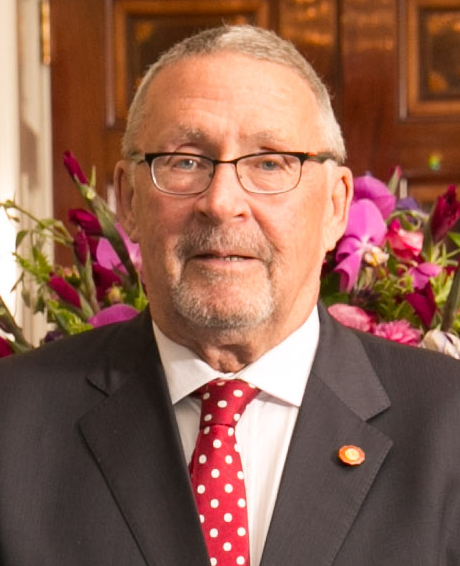
Guy Scott, President of Zambia

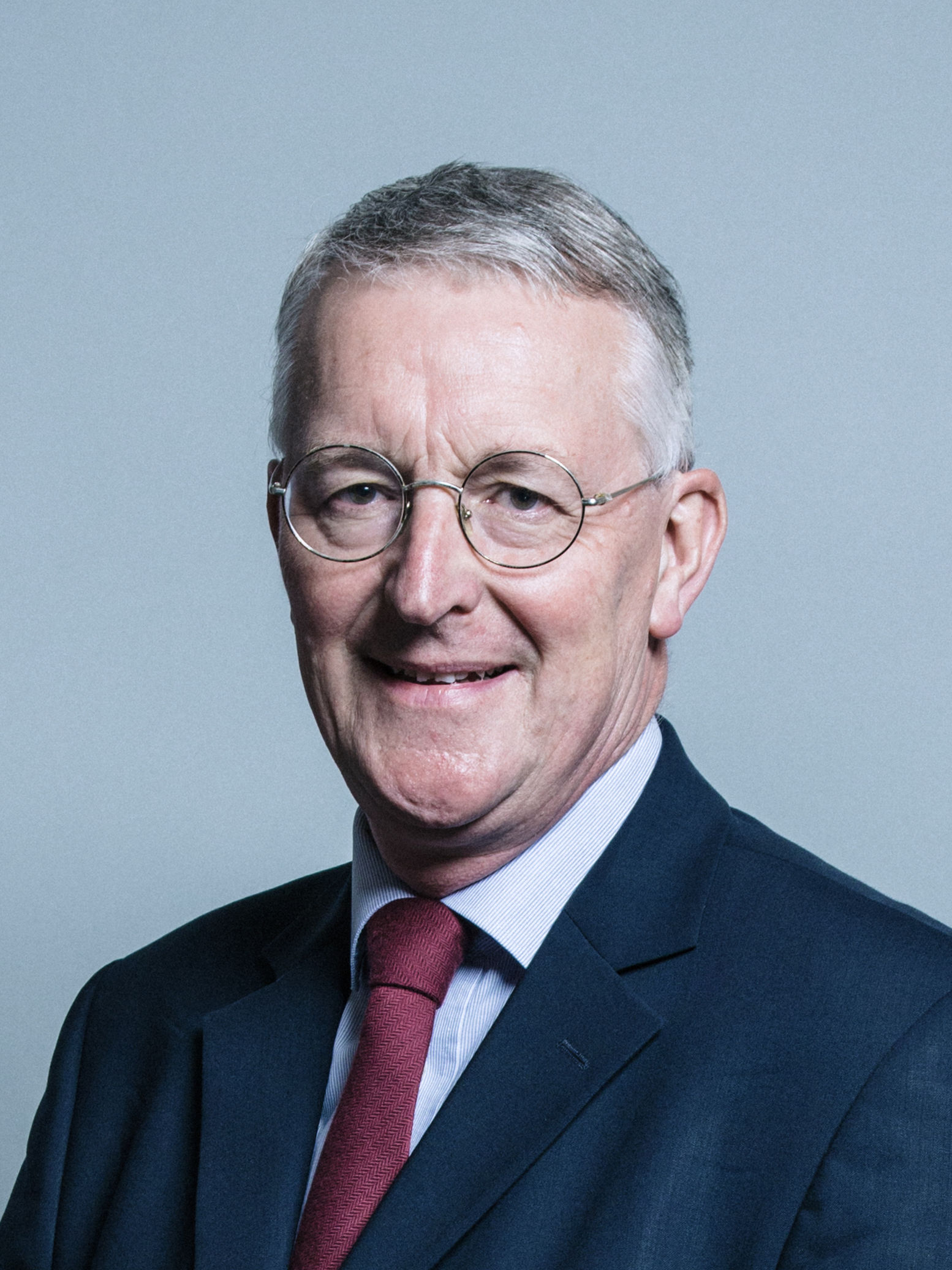
Hilary Benn, UK Shadow Foreign Secretary (2015–16)

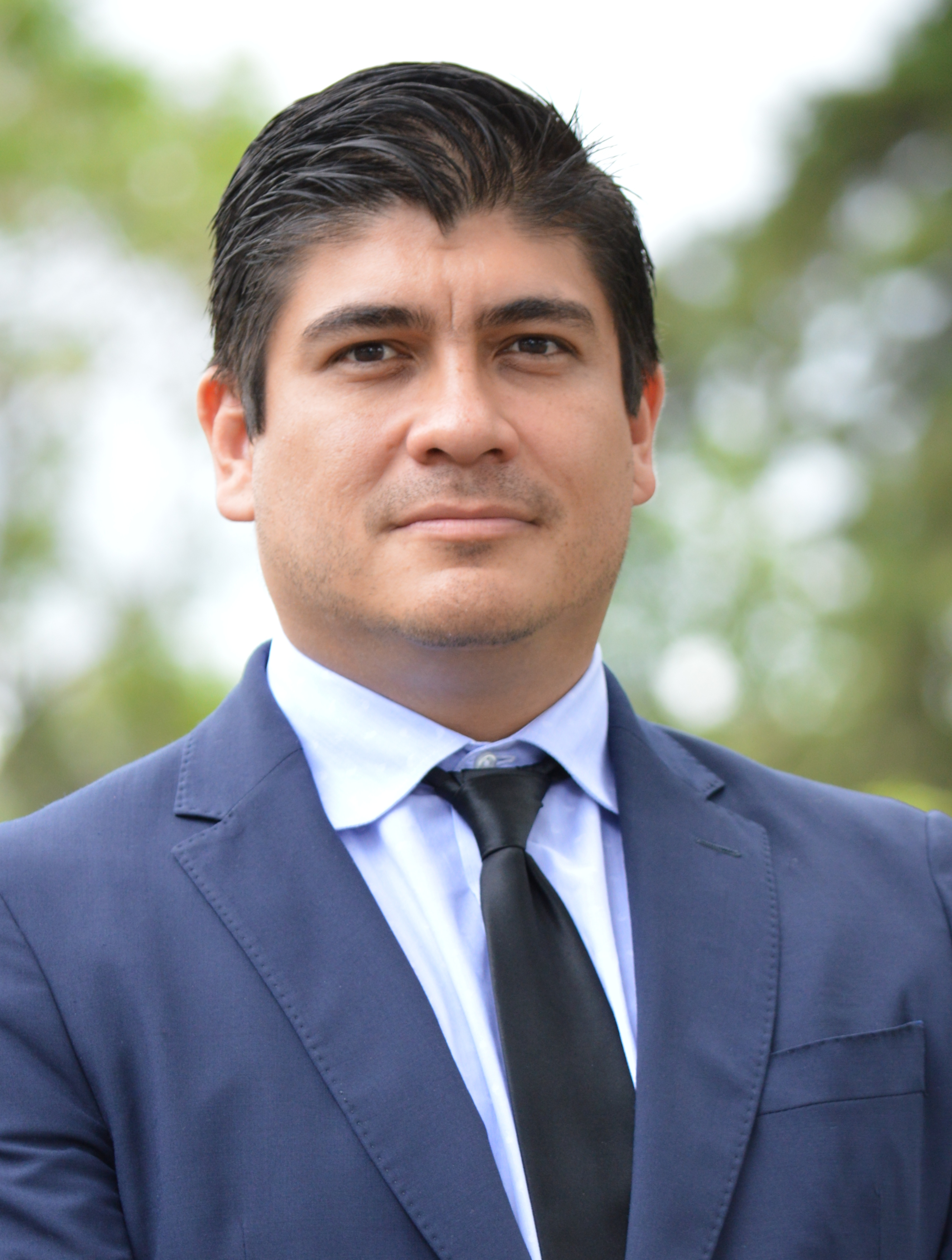
Carlos Alvarado Quesada, President of Costa Rica

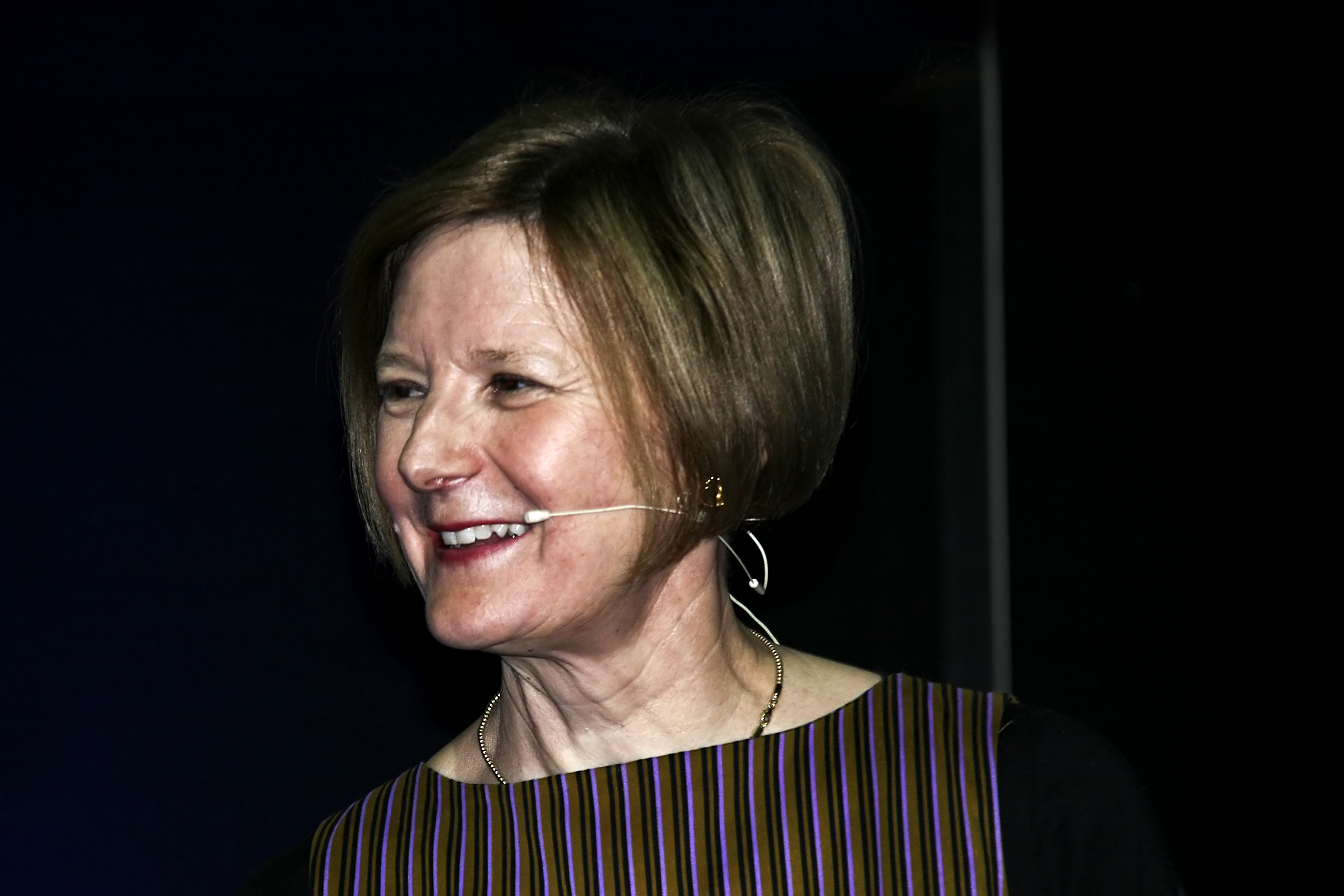
Helen Boaden, BBC's Director

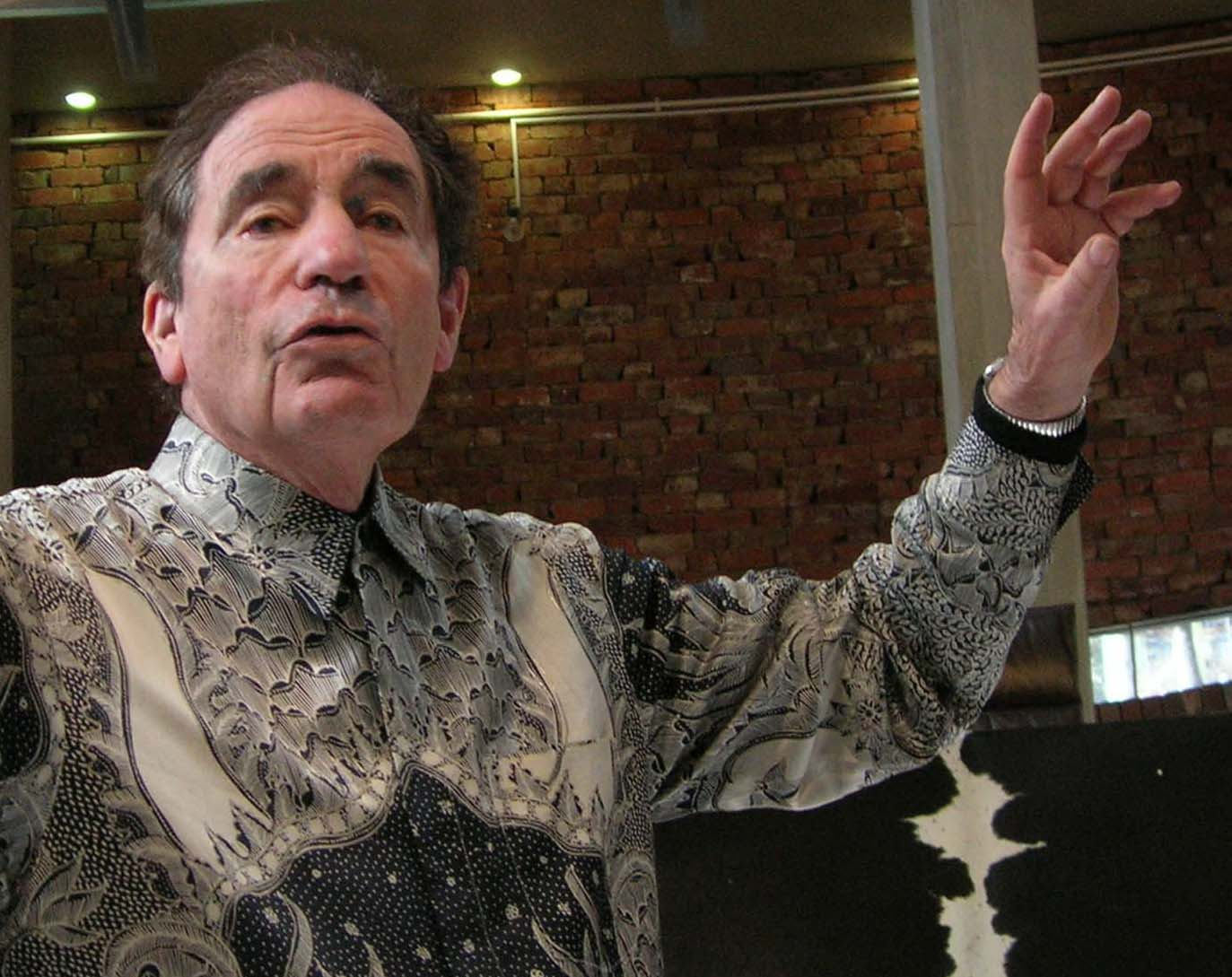
Albie Sachs, Activist and Judge on the Constitutional Court of South Africa

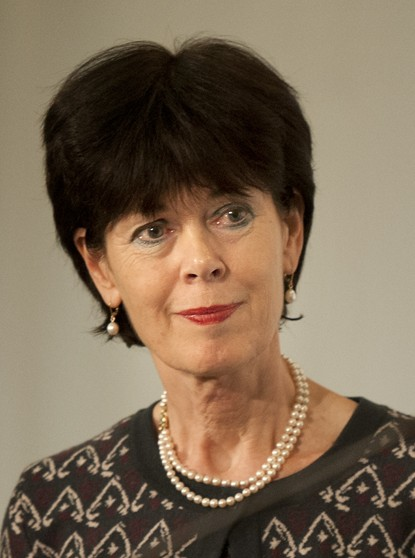
Renée Jones-Bos, Dutch diplomat and ambassador to the United States (2007-2012) and to Russia (2016-)

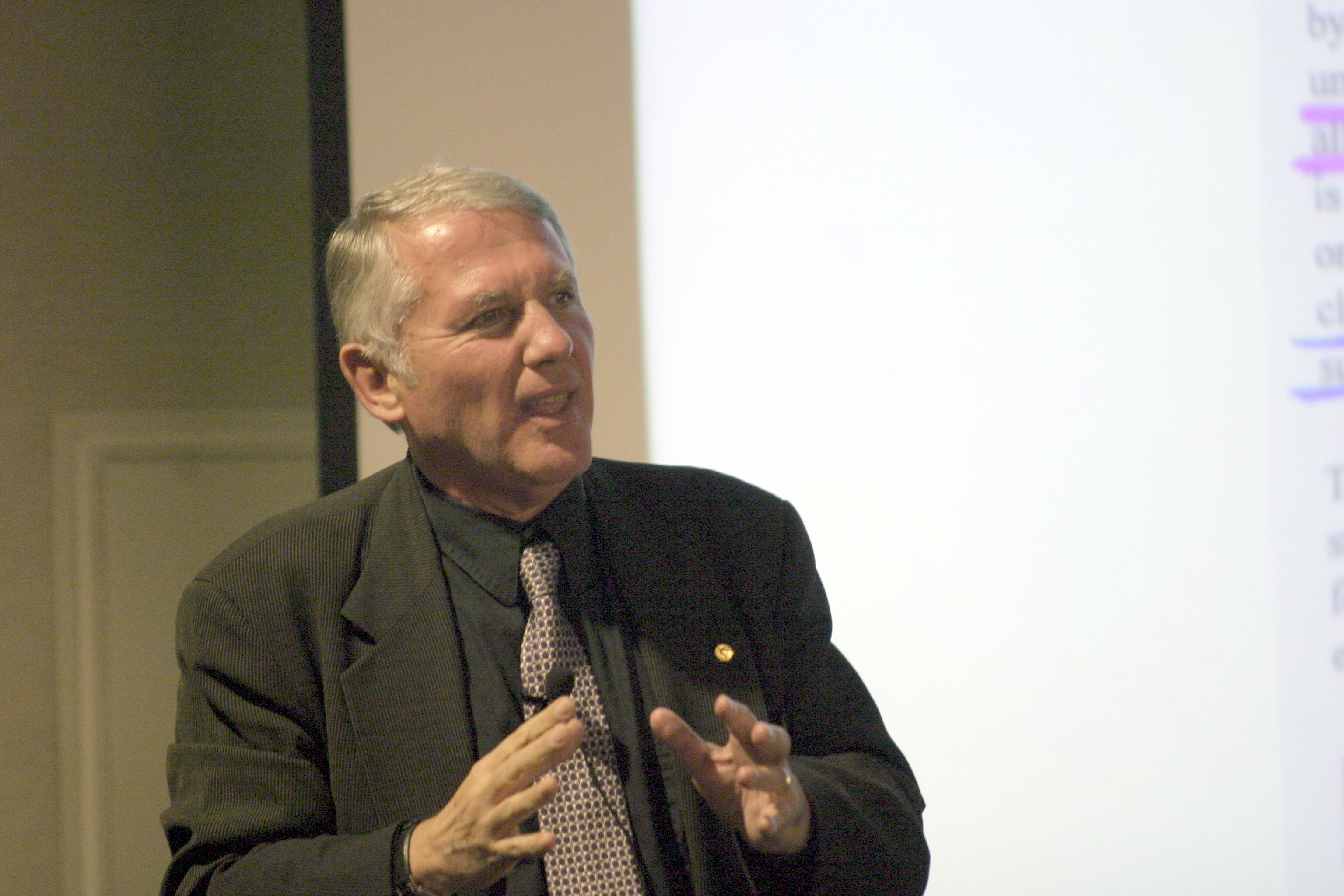
Dimitri Nanopoulos, quantum physicist and Distinguished Professor at Texas A&M

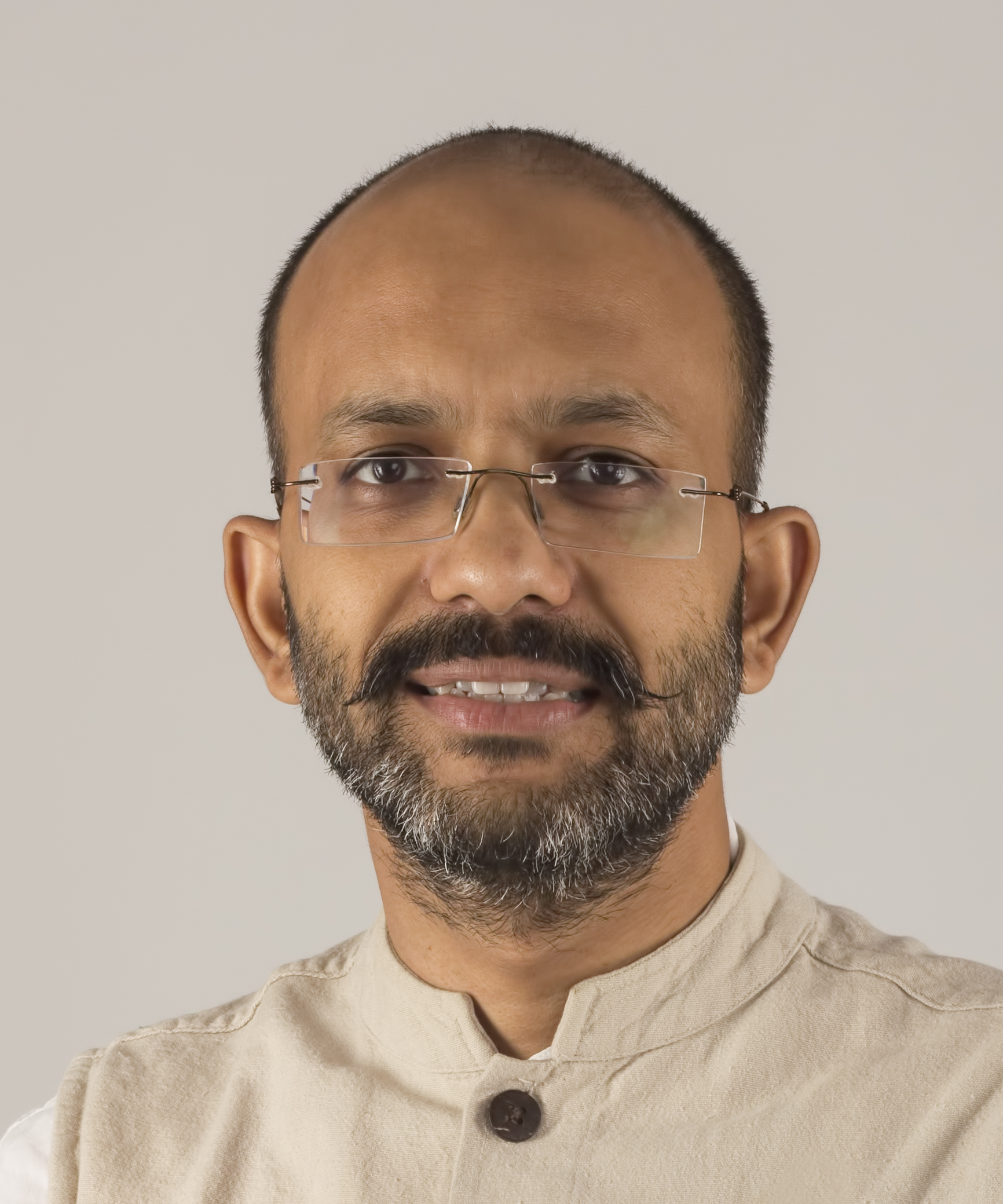
Shantanu Gupta, Author & Political Analyst

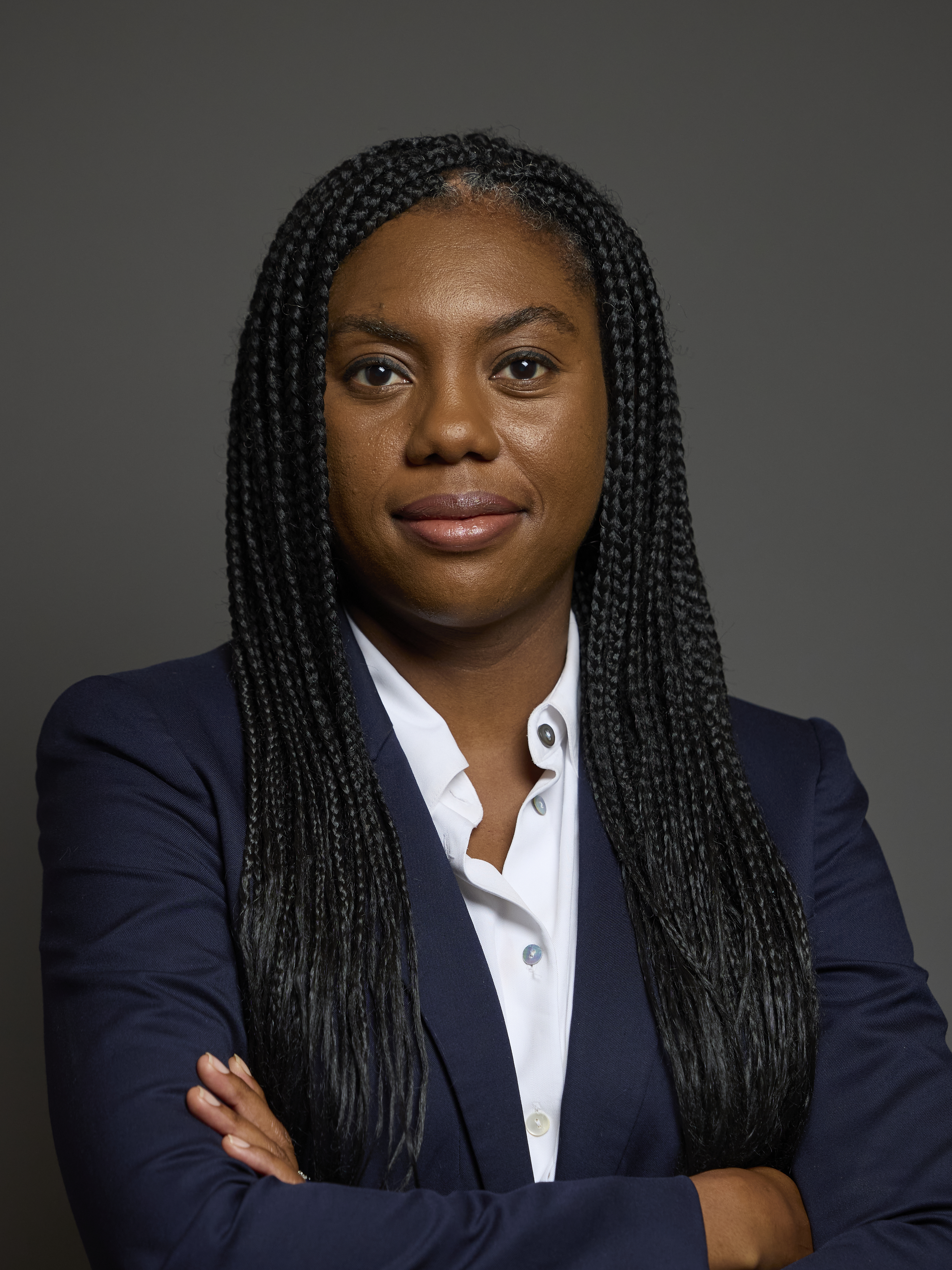
Kemi Badenoch, Leader of the Conservative Party (2024–) and Leader of the Opposition

=== Notable staff ===
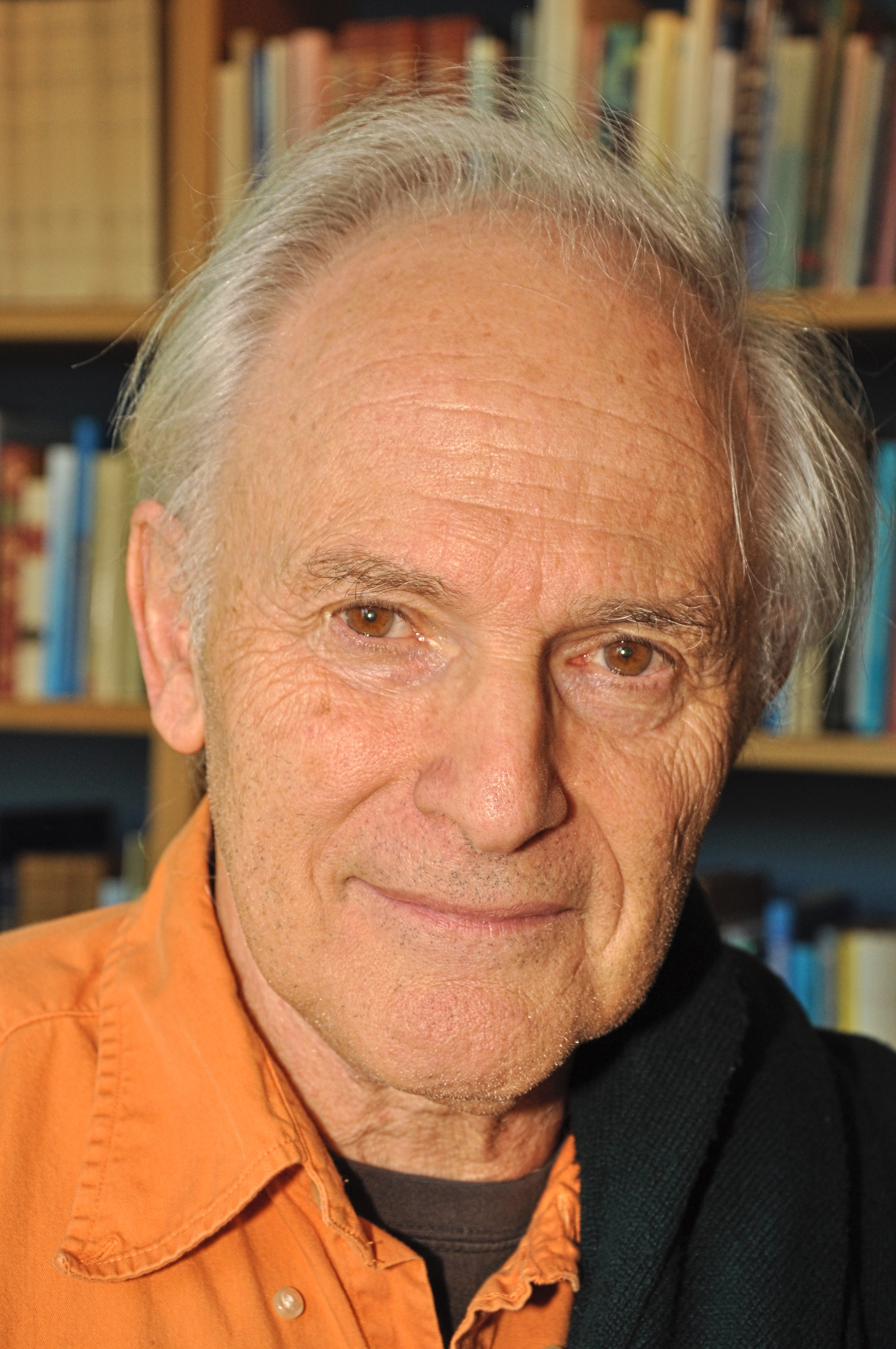
Sir Harold Kroto, 1996 Nobel Prize for Chemistry

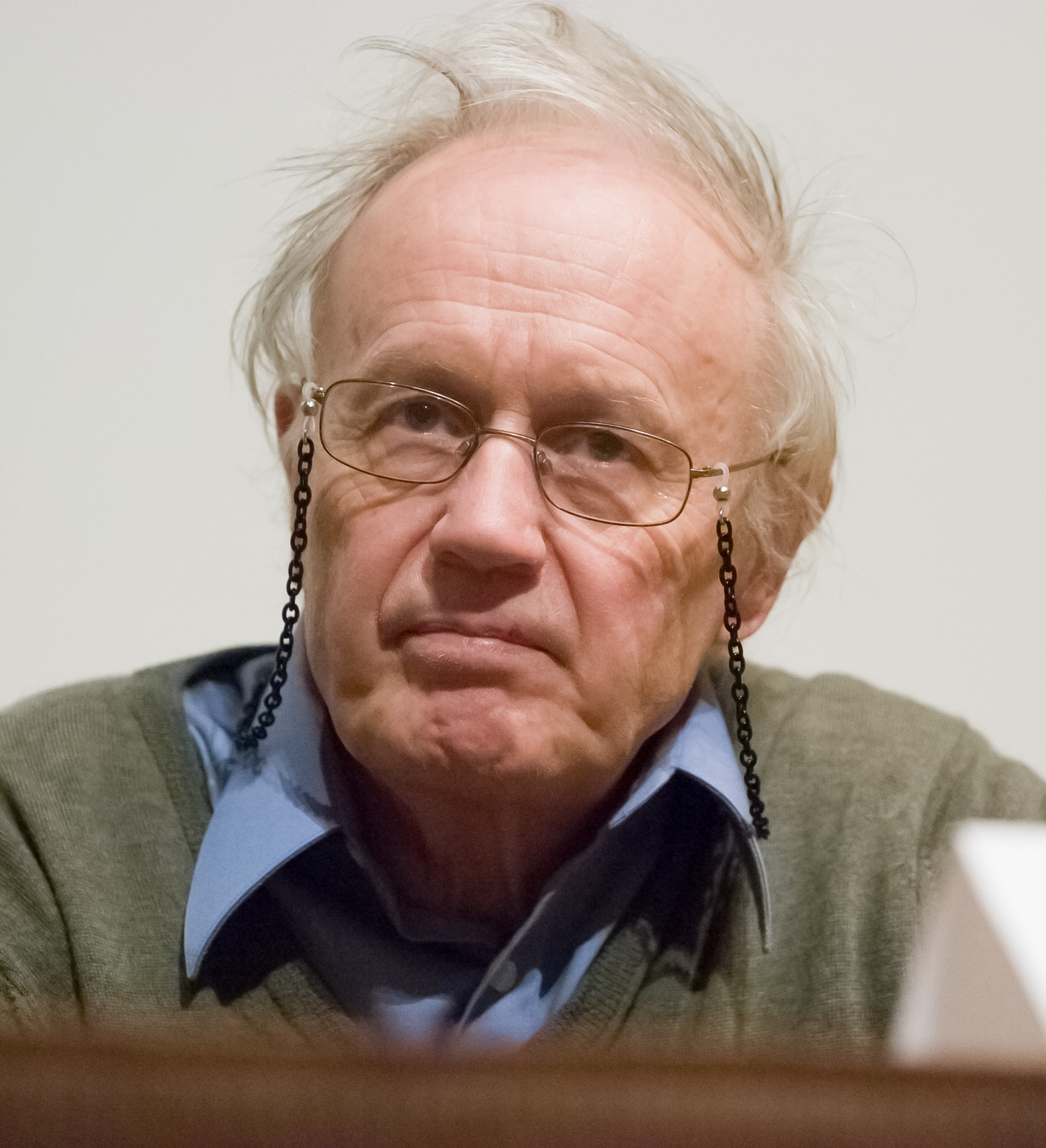
Sir Anthony Leggett, 2003 Nobel Prize for Physics

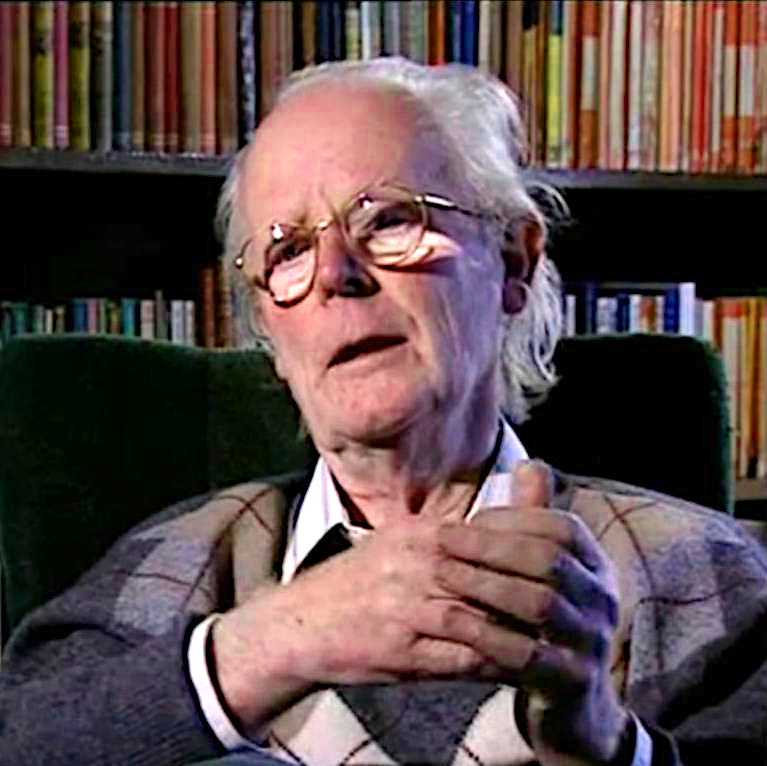
John Maynard Smith, 1999 Crafoord Prize for Biosciences

In the sciences, Sussex counts among its past and present faculty five Nobel Prize winners: Sir Anthony Leggett, Sir Paul Nurse, Archer Martin, Sir John Cornforth and Sir Harry Kroto. John Maynard Smith, FRS, founding father of Sussex Biology was honoured with the Crafoord Prize and the Kyoto Prize for his contributions to Evolutionary Biology.

The university has 15 Fellows of the Royal Society. These include Geoffrey Cloke (Inorganic Chemistry); Michael F. Land (Animal Vision – Frink Medal); Michael Lappert (Inorganic Chemistry); John Murrell (Theoretical Chemistry); Laurence Pearl (Structural Biology) and Guy Richardson (Neuroscience). Additionally, two of its faculty have received the Leontief Prize: Michael Lipton and Mariana Mazzucato.

In the Humanities and Social sciences, there are ten members of faculty who have the distinction of being Fellows of the British Academy. Staff with FBAs include Donald Winch (economics), Peter Burke (historian), Craig Clunas, Peter France, Barry Supple, Margaret Boden, Pat Thane, John Barrell.

Other prominent academics on the staff of the university have included: Geoffrey Bennington; Homi K. Bhabha (postcolonialism); Ranajit Guha (founder of Subaltern studies); Jonathan Dollimore (Renaissance literature, gender and queer studies); Katy Gardner (social anthropology); Gabriel Josipovici (Dante, the Bible); Jacqueline Rose (feminism, psychoanalysis); Nicholas Royle (modern literature and theory; deconstruction); Alan Sinfield (Shakespeare, sexuality, queer theory); Martin Rees, Baron Rees of Ludlow (Cosmologist); Brian Street (anthropology); John D. Barrow (Cosmologist); Leon Mestel (Astronomer); Gavin Ashenden (Senior Lecturer in English, University Chaplain, broadcaster and Chaplain to Queen Elizabeth II); Keith Pavitt (science and technology policy), and Christopher Freeman (Economist).

Current notable staff (in addition to a number of those mentioned above) include philosopher Andy Clark, economist Richard Tol, psychologist Andy Field, neuroscientist Anil Seth, biologist Dave Goulson, sociologist Gerard Delanty, development economist Sir Richard Jolly, astrophysicist and writer John Gribbin, historian Robin Milner-Gulland, scholar Edward Timms, author Gabriel Josipovici, geographer Melissa Leach, psychologist Dame Lesley Fallowfield, psychologist Brian Bates, biologist Laurence Pearl, historian Maurice Howard, sociologist Jennifer Platt, Dame Denise Holt, policymaker Andy Stirling, political economist Mick Moore, pharmacist Bugewa Apampa, anthropologist Philip Proudfoot and experimental physicist Antonella De Santo.

== Arms ==
The university's coat of arms was officially granted on 15 March 1962. It built on Sussex's history and features two Saxon crowns and a sable (black) dolphin. The arms also features six martlets, a mythical bird without feet that traditionally represents continuous effort, as per the traditional emblem of East and West Sussex counties. On either side of the arms are two pelicans, head bowed down, each standing upon a book and supporting a staff.

Since 2011, the coat of arms is only used by the graduation team and on official university degrees. For all other purposes, the US logo is used.

Coat of arms of University of Sussex
Notes Granted 15 March 1962 Crest On a wreath Argent and Gules, Two dolphins embowed, heads downwards, enfiled by a Saxon crown Or. Escutcheon Argent, on a chevron per pale Azure and Gules six martlets Or, between in chief two Saxon- crowns and in base a dolphin naiant Sable. Supporters On either side a pelican in her piety Proper standing upon a book Gules, edged Or, each supporting a staff also Proper, that on the dexter flying a banner of the second charged with a lion passant guardant Gold dimidiating the hull of an ancient ship Argent, and that on the sinister flying a banner of the second charged with a stag's head caboshed Silver. Motto 'Be still and know'

== See also ==
- Armorial of UK universities
- List of universities in the United Kingdom
- Plate glass university
