= Dream Team series 8 =

Dream Team
- Season 8
- No. of episodes: 32

Release
- Original network: Sky One
- Original release: October 17, 2004 – May 29, 2005

Series chronology
- ← Previous; Series 7 Next → Series 9

The eighth series of Dream Team was broadcast on Sky One from October 2004 to May 2005, covering the 2004–05 English football season. It followed the story of Harchester United attempting to return to the Premier League after relegation the previous season and their first participation in the UEFA Champions League.

== Cast ==
Several new faces were brought on board for series eight, primarily from the club's backstage personnel. The most notable of the new signings was former Boyzone singer Shane Lynch, in his first major acting role on television.

=== Main cast ===
- Stephen Rahman-Hughes as Carl Caskey
- Timothy Smith as Clyde Connelly
- Chucky Venice as Curtis Alexander
- Danny Husbands as Danny Sullivan
- Michael Ryan as Dean Boyle
- Jon Morrison as Don Barker
- Shane Lynch as Eli Knox
- Colin Parry as Frank Stone
- Kara Tointon as Gina Moliano
- Lucinda Rhodes-Flaherty as Jodie Stone
- Terry Kiely as Karl Fletcher
- James Watts as Lee Presley
- Ricky Whittle as Ryan Naysmith
- Lisa McAllister as Sofia Moxham
- Chris Brazier as Tommy Valentine
- Philip Brodie as Vivian "Jaws" Wright

=== Supporting cast ===
- Andy Ansah as himself
- Karen Ferrari as Chelsea Wright
- Darren White as Darren Tyson
- Lamorna Watts as Holly Jones
- Ray MacAllan as Jeff Stein
- Rebecca Loos as Naomi Wyatt
- Ike Hamilton as Nathan Woods
- Cassandra Bell as Nicole Caskey
- Nina Muschallik as Nikki Peggs
- Hannah Tointon as Savannah Caskey

In addition there were cameo appearances throughout the series by Jeff Stelling and George Gavin as themselves. Kevin Keatings remained as match commentator for the third consecutive series.

== Episodes ==
No.	Title	Written by	Original release date
8.01	"Down"	Harry Hewland	October 17, 2004
Harchester unsuccessfully appeal against UEFA's decision to relegate them to the Championship, though are allowed to keep their place in the Champions League. Gambling tycoon Eli Knox purchases the club on the toss of a coin, with Don Barker, a manager with plenty of experience within lower league football leaving Wigan Athletic to take the post at the Dragon's Lair. Barker brings in both defender Frank Stone from Wigan and right-wing midfielder Tommy Valentine, on loan from Chelsea. Clyde is forced to play in a new position in order to fit Tommy into the squad, and takes an instant disliking to the change. The first match of the season is a disaster, Harchester lose 1-0 away to newly promoted Brighton & Hove Albion, with Barker sent to the stands for arguing with the referee. First appearances of: Don Barker, Frank Stone, Jodie Stone, Eli Knox, Sofia Moxham and Tommy Valentine
8.02	"Out"	Jaswinder Bancil & Jesse O'Mahoney	October 24, 2004
Harchester prepare to fly out to Portugal to face Sporting Lisbon in the first leg of their Champions League qualifying match. Lee Presley is forced to stay behind after receiving an offer from Manchester United but later sneaks off to join the rest of the team. After dislocating his shoulder in the gym, Tommy tries to excuse himself out of training but this leads to Barker abandoning him 15 miles away from the team hotel. Having travelled to Lisbon to bring Lee back, he and Nikki end up sleeping together whilst the rest of the team is thrown into jail, apart from Viv, after brawling in the hotel bar. The next morning, the team is bailed out by Barker to play, with the exception of Tommy, after trainee physio Holly Jones hides his passport. Manchester United drop their interest in Lee and he plays in the game, scoring within the first minute of the match. First appearance of: Holly Jones
8.03	"Last Exit to Harchester"	Andrew Hunt	October 31, 2004
Despite taking the lead, Harchester lose the first leg of their Champions League qualifier 2-1 against Sporting Lisbon. Determined to keep their key players to win promotion, Eli tells Dean to stall all upcoming planned transfers, as Barcelona become keen on signing Lee whilst Bolton Wanderers prepare to make a bid for Viv. Harchester win the second leg 1-0 to qualify for the Champions League on the away goals rule thanks to a Lee Presley penalty. With nobody now allowed to leave Harchester until the end of the season, both Nikki and Jeff leave the club for good, but not before Nikki and Lee's liaison in Portugal is exposed. Final appearances of: Nikki Peggs and Jeff Stein
8.04	"Boot Camp"	Rachel Flowerday	November 7, 2004
Determined to toughen the team up for a period of crucial matches, Barker takes the team to an army boot camp. Still recovering from a broken leg at the England training camp over the Summer, Ryan Naysmith continues to feel left out and Dean asks Viv's wife, Chelsea to keep him company whilst the rest of the team is away. At boot camp, Clyde is berated for really being out of shape and Curtis' role as team captain is under severe threat. In the final challenge, an army assault course, Curtis helps Clyde complete the challenge and it convinces Barker to allow him keep the captaincy.
8.05	"El Burro"	Jesse O'Mahoney	November 14, 2004
A 2-0 win for Harchester away at West Ham United earns Barker the 'Manager of the Month' award. Ahead of their first Champions League match at home to Barcelona, Jodie suggests to Dean to hold a shirt auction as a way of a charity fundraiser to welcome the representatives of Barcelona. Meanwhile, Ryan and Chelsea to continue to grow closer and at the match, they endure a liaison inside the stadium's utility room. Barcelona win 5-0 and Frank and Clyde blame one another for the dreadful display. Later on, Frank's temper boils over and he beats up Clyde to within an inch of his life.
8.06	"Stonegate"	Ben Harris	November 21, 2004
Ryan and Chelsea discover a battered and bloodied Clyde and contact Barker. After being released from hospital, Clyde is furious to discover Barker has done nothing about the situation and gets his own back by selling the story to the press. Later, Clyde has a drunken night out at a lap dancing club which Barker becomes aware of. He uses this to his advantage by playing him the next day at home to Gillingham, which they lose 2-0. After the match, Barker invites Clyde to the press conference and he is humiliated over the revelations of the previous night, leaving him more depressed than ever.
8.07	"The Long Kiss Goodnight"	Ben Harris	November 28, 2004
Clyde deliberately refuses to show up for training, making Barker schedule extra training for the entire team and making Clyde more isolated. After another drunken tryst, Clyde makes a pass at Holly and offends Chelsea, leading Ryan to punch him in the face. Realising that Viv will eventually discover their secret, Ryan and Chelsea decide to flee to the Maldives. Before the team's Champions League game at home to Paris Saint-Germain, Tommy urges Barker not to play Clyde but he refuses. At the airport, Ryan is too engrossed in watching the match and Chelsea ends up leaving without him. Harchester win the game 2-0, as Clyde sets up a goal for Curtis and scores the other. Clyde is substituted towards the end of the match and heads straight down the dugout and onto the gantry, committing suicide by jumping off the stadium roof. Final appearances of: Clyde Connelly and Chelsea Wright
8.08	"Blame"	Andrew Hunt	December 5, 2004
The team's celebrations are cut short by news of Clyde Connelly's suicide. As they head back to Viv's bar, Viv discovers Chelsea has left him and confesses that she had been having an affair but did not mention that it was with Ryan. Upset, Viv throws everyone out and later confesses to Ryan that he will kill whoever was sleeping with his wife. Holly discovers a letter that Clyde left her before he killed himself, revealing about his anguish, and with the support of Tommy and Clyde's mother, the letter is released to the press and Barker's job is in severe jeopardy. Viv later becomes convinced that Ryan slept Chelsea and threatens him with a shotgun, Ryan quickly puts the blame on Clyde which Viv reluctantly accepts. After Tommy scores a penalty to help Harchester beat Wolverhampton Wanderers 1-0, Barker clears his name in the press conference and keeps his job.
8.09	"Coupe De Foudre"	Rachel Flowerday	December 12, 2004
Whilst visiting Clyde's grave, Dean meets the leader of the Harchester Supporters Association, Shay Maguire, who convinces Dean to ask Eli to make extra transfer funds available, which Dean intends on using to purchase Juventus playmaker Carlos Valdez, but Italian club will only agree if Tommy moves in the opposite direction to them. Believing that the match against Wigan Athletic is more important than their trip to Paris Saint Germain, Barker rests Tommy and Lee for the Champions League game. After Tommy tells Shay over Barker's plan, Shay hijacks the coach until Barker changes his mind. An illness outbreak ultimately postpones the Wigan match, but with little time to prepare, Lee and Tommy are unable to make any impact, the latter is substituted at half-time and his move to Juventus is later called off, PSG win the game 1–0.
8.10	"Who Ate All The Pies?"	Jaswinder Bancil	December 19, 2004
A last minute equaliser at home to Celtic has left Harchester with a fighting chance of reaching the knockout stages of the Champions League. Arriving in Spain for the final group match against Barcelona, Dean runs into Karl Fletcher, who now plays his football for Real Murcia. With his connections in Spain, Fletch convinces Dean to bid for Gabriel Batistuta. Meanwhile, Tommy is left in hot water after his affair with Shay's wife Michelle is revealed after Jodie sends an intimate picture directly to Shay. Against all odds Harchester win 1-0 at the Nou Camp, and a 2-2 draw between PSG and Celtic sends Harchester through to the last 16 of the Champions League. At the post-match party, the deal to bring Batistuta to Harchester falls through leaving Dean to convince Fletch to return to Harchester instead, whilst Shay sneaks inside and stabs Tommy in the back for revenge in sleeping with his wife.
8.11	"A Contract Killing"	Jesse O'Mahoney	January 2, 2005
Tommy is in a critical condition in hospital after being stabbed by Shay, who is consequently arrested by Spanish police. However a false alibi from his mates allows to him to be released without charge and a scared Tommy is forced to hire a personal bodyguard and after suffering a panic attack in the middle of the night - he even considers requesting for Shay to be taken out! Meanwhile, an application for an academy trial leads to the speculation that Fletch could have a secret son. Later, whilst watching Harchester's latest Championship fixture against Derby County, Fletch signs the contract in Dean's pocket to bring him back home to Harchester.
8.12	"This Town Ain't Big Enough"	Jane Hewland & Tom Rob Smith	January 9, 2005
Fletch's return to Harchester has got the fans excited ahead of their FA Cup third round tie against Manchester City. Barker, however, doesn't share the same enthusiasm and Fletch quickly struggles with the training regime. Following a lads night out with Lee, Barker chooses to play Fletch and drop Lee so that the fans will view him as finished. Lee suffers further consequences to his previous night's actions when two young ladies appear at the game asking for him, ruining his chance of growing closer towards Shanice - the mother of academy wonder kid Byron. In the second half, the players attempt to cut Fletch out of play but when they win a free kick at the edge of the box, Fletch takes it before Curtis can and scores to send Harchester through to the next round.
8.13	"The Man Who Knew Too Much"	Rachel Flowerday	January 16, 2005
As the players celebrate their FA Cup win over Manchester City, Curtis is shocked to discover Frank in the back seat of his car in a compromising position with another man. Fearing that Curtis will expose this, Frank demands a transfer away from Harchester. Meanwhile, despite Gina's efforts to get Fletch in shape, Barker drops him to the reserves for the weekend and whilst he struggles and is even substituted against Arsenal Reserves, Frank puts in a stellar performance for the first team against Plymouth Argyle until he comes face to face with the man in the car at half time and unable to focus, a rash challenge sees him sent off. Nevertheless, Harchester hold on to win 3-2. That night, Fletch and Lee are caught drink driving and have to be bailed out by Viv. Realising Fletch is a bad role model for Lee, Viv demands that he moves in with him. Curtis finally gives in and tells Barker everything about what he saw about Frank. Furious, Barker violently confronts Frank and determined to protect Jodie from heartbreak, announces he will press ahead with selling him to Portsmouth.
8.14	"Playing God"	Jaswinder Bancil & Jane Hewland	January 23, 2005
Jodie is crestfallen to be told that Frank is leaving for Portsmouth by Barker, still unaware of the horrible truth behind it, and claiming that the bust-up was over an affair with another woman. With Gina's help, Jodie tracks down Frank in Portsmouth and Frank backs up Barker's sordid lie, claiming he is filing for divorce. Elsewhere, whilst Lee gives his team-mates a tour of Viv's place, they discover his secret project that Viv insists is helping Harchester in getting promoted. Viv later sets Lee up on a blind date with Shanice which goes more smoother than expected. Later, after a secret change of heart, Frank returns home but just as he does, Jodie leaves wanting some time apart.
8.15	"Hangover From Hell"	Tom Rob Smith & Jane Hewland	January 30, 2005
Much to Barker's chagrin, Dean has agreed personal terms for Curtis to move to Charlton Athletic. Barker however soon intercepts a fax from Charlton asking for a second medical and as the players arrange a leaving party for their club captain, Barker pays off a bar waitress to spike all of Curtis' drinks. Curtis ends up seriously drunk and wakes the next morning with a massive hangover, but sure enough fails his second medical with Charlton after drugs are found in his system. During the party, Viv gets attached to Lilia and they spend the night together. Barker's plan though soon goes awry when the CCTV tapes from the night of the party go missing and in a confrontation with Lilia, she knocks him out with a frying pan. The team however has secretly got hold of the incriminating tape and discovers the truth and with Curtis in the clear, he and Barker forgive each other for the mess they each put themselves in.
8.16	"Gamblers Ruin"	Jesse O'Mahoney	February 6, 2005
Eli Knox has gotten word of Viv's project and claims that no one can predict the future. To prove it, he sets up a game of blackjack between himself, Viv and Spartak Moscow owner Nicolai Kulikov. Kulikov wins the hand and makes intentions to purchase Tommy Valentine. Subsequent efforts by both Harchester and Chelsea to prevent the move fail and it appears Tommy is on his way to the Russian club. Being brought back to reality though proves to be the least of Viv's worries when his ex-wife starts reappearing in his life, and desperate for help, he turns to psychologist Naomi Wyatt. Final appearance of: Tommy Valentine; Guest star: Rebecca Loos as Naomi Wyatt
8.17	"Purple Reign"	Jesse O'Mahoney	February 13, 2005
It's the day of Harchester's FA Cup fifth round match against Southampton but a protest from the Harchester Supporters Association over Eli's running of the club, secretly masterminded by Barker, locks all of the staff and players in the ground. The game is called off and during the lock-in, Lee confronts Viv over his mental state leading him to flip out. Naomi eventually calms him down but much of the team, especially Lee, still fear over what he may do next. Barker decides to rest Viv but when reserve keeper Alex Lawler is injured in warm-up and youth goalie Nathan Woods appears too nervous to start, Barker elects to play Viv for the rearranged tie. All seems to be going well until the half-time team talk, with Viv suddenly has visions of Clyde appearing next to him. Still under the influence that he was responsible for the break-up between him and Chelsea. Viv lashes out violently and causes a nasty injury to Lee. Nathan plays in goal for the second half but lets Southampton take a 2-0 lead. The angry fans begin brawling in the stands and soon spread out onto the pitch and into the streets, as the match is abandoned. Guest star: Rebecca Loos as Naomi Wyatt
8.18	"The Race Card"	Jaswinder Bancil, Jane Hewland & Jesse O'Mahoney	February 20, 2005
The FA kicks Harchester out of the FA Cup for their fans uncontrollable behaviour, awarding Southampton a 3-0 forfeit win. A furious Eli announces to Dean and Barker that they will be fired unless they win their next match - a Champions League tie away in Lazio. With Viv and Lee ruled out and Ryan Naysmith still a serious doubt recovering from his broken leg, Barker sells Dean the idea to throw the match in order to give them more time and they quickly concoct a plan to get the game abandoned and convince UEFA that Lazio would be responsible for it. Barker tells Nathan he'll offer him a professional contract if he sticks to his end of the bargain, by cutting himself with a sharp coin whilst Dean pays a group of supporters to travel to the game as Lazio fans to help inflict the violent scenes. The plan is pulled off as the referee ends up calling the game off with the score at 1-1.
8.19	"In Blood This Far Steep'd"	Lewis Georgeson & Jesse O'Mahoney	February 27, 2005
UEFA investigates into Lazio's apparent misconduct that forced the abandonment of their Champions League match with Harchester. Barker and Dean's plot soon unravels when first William and his mates, who Dean paid to cause the trouble in the stadium, are arrested for starting a brawl in a nearby bar and Dean refuses to bail them out. Then Nathan, in a guilt of consciousness, considers to tell UEFA the truth over what happened. UEFA later decides to void the abandoned match and that Harchester and Lazio will replay in a one-legged match at the Dragons Lair to determine who will reach the quarter-finals of the competition. Guilt-ridden, Dean attempts to meet Eli to discuss resigning but runs into a trap when the taxi driver and passengers turn out to be William and his cronies. Barker is too late to stop them and soon afterwards, collapses in the car park, clutching his chest in pain.
8.20	"The Attack"	Tom Rob Smith	March 6, 2005
Barker and Dean are in hospital, the former after suffering a heart attack and the latter after being beaten to within an inch of his life. Jodie returns and tells Frank she is pregnant and is planning to have an abortion. Against doctors orders, Barker returns to work in preparation for the crucial Champions League game against Lazio, and convinces Gina to accompany Jodie to her termination appointment for moral support. As Jodie begins filling out the forms, she begins to have second thoughts and decides not to go through it, when she sees Frank scoring a penalty that sends Harchester through to the Champions League quarter-finals.
8.21	"Before A Fall"	Rachel Flowerday	March 13, 2005
Barker pledges to give Fletch more responsibility after his tactics helped Harchester beat Lazio. Fletch begins by bringing in Viv back into first team training, much to Lee's dismay, and is also told by Barker to tell Frank that Jodie lost the baby so that he is unaware that Jodie has actually kept it. Frank doesn't take the news well and gets blind drunk before inviting another man around to sleep with. Jodie then has a change of heart and tells Frank the real truth. Viv later reopens the bar that night and after closing time, snaps at Nathan telling him that he should have no intention of taking his place in goal. Guest star: Rebecca Loos as Naomi Wyatt
8.22	"Mind Games"	Tom Rob Smith & Jane Hewland	March 20, 2005
Determined to prove a point, Viv tells Nathan he should hand in a transfer request or he'll send one for himself. Having taken some time out, Barker arrives back home earlier than expected believing his job is under threat from Fletch, though Jodie tells him to give Fletch one more match, certain that he will screw up soon enough. The next game, at home to Sheffield United, is watched by Barker in the director's box and when both the away team take lead and Fletch is sent off for a second bookable offence, Barker considers his presence is required and relieves Fletch of his duties at half-time. He brings Viv on in place of Nathan in goal and Harchester promptly turn it around to win.
8.23	"The Sting"	Jesse O'Mahoney & Rachel Flowerday	March 27, 2005
Fletch and Dean form an alliance to remove Barker from the club. Their first act is to make contact with football agent Joel Brooks to bring in one of Fletch's old youth mates, Carl Caskey, whose own career has fallen on hard times. As they would expect, Barker doesn't rate Carl highly but that all changes when he meets Carl's wife, Nicole. He promptly scores with her and gives Carl a rolling contract for the remainder of the season. Unaware that Fletch and Dean have hidden cameras to capture everything, Barker is recorded threatening Nicole that if she doesn't sleep with him, he will cancel Carl's contract with the club. First appearance of: Carl Caskey; Guest star: Craig Charles as Joel Brooks
8.24	"Show The Don Respect"	Jaswinder Bancil & Rachel Flowerday	April 3, 2005
To cover up Barker's misdeeds, Dean suggests that he tells the press that he is resigning from the club because of ill health. However, Barker calls his bluff and vows not to go anywhere, even when Dean attempts to sack him on the training ground. A fan's protest soon begins with "Show The Don Respect" t-shirts being handed out. Having seemingly made the situation worse, Eli is unmoved by the incriminating tape and sacks Dean from the club for his misconduct. After catching Barker and Nicole in a comprising position, Carl is determined to get rid of Barker. Together with Fletch and Dean, they show the tape to players just minutes before the game against Ipswich Town. Disgusted, they tell Barker to leave.
8.25	"The New Gaffer"	Lewis Georgeson & Tom Rob Smith	April 10, 2005
Harchester are soundly beaten 3-0 by Ipswich. After the match, Eli informs that one of the players must take on the duty of manager for the rest of season when no one else shows interest. Fletch and Curtis are the obvious candidates and Viv visionises what it would be like with each of them in charge. Fletch's managerial skills and tactics would alienate much of the squad whilst Curtis would employ a faith healer and Ryan Naysmith would break his leg again. Coming to the conclusion that neither would be the best manager for Harchester, Viv tells Eli that none of them have what it takes and Eli promptly installs him as player-manager, much to the surprise of the team. The first leg of the Champions League quarter-final against Arsenal though goes better than what Viv thought it would be under different management, and Harchester are unlucky to lose the game 1-0.
8.26	"A Champions League Outing"	Jesse O'Mahoney	April 17, 2005
Journalist Paul Hankin reveals to Frank that Samuel Taylor, the man who had a fling with Frank in the back of his car months ago, is preparing to sell his story to the tabloids. In training, Viv attempts to emphasise the tactics used by Arsenal to give them the advantage ahead of the second leg, but it doesn't have the desired impact that he hopes for and even briefly considers shooting Lee in the process! Frank's sordid affair is published in the papers and he face ostracism from his team-mates whilst Curtis faces criticism for not telling them sooner than finding out from the press. For the sake of his mind, Viv tells Frank he won't play him tonight and he consoles by himself in the physio room. Before the match, a furious Jodie verbally attacks Curtis for his supposed actions before realising that Barker was in fact out to destroy her marriage in this debacle. The strain eventually takes its toll on Jodie and she soon collapses in Gina's arms, complaining that something is wrong with her unborn child.
8.27	"The Hand That Rocks The Cradle"	Jesse O'Mahoney & Tom Rob Smith	April 24, 2005
Jodie is rushed to hospital with Frank and Dean at her side. Jodie is told that she has lost the baby and when Barker gets word of what's happened, he rushes to his daughter's side, only to be told by her that she never wants him in her life again. Meanwhile, Harchester fight hard to earn a 1-1 draw but go out of the Champions League, losing 2-1 on aggregate to Arsenal. With Harchester lying 8th in the Championship, the focus now shifts to earning a place in the play-offs. During the home match against relegation-bound Nottingham Forest, a clearly unbalanced Jodie makes off with one of Danny Sullivan's twin babies when no one is looking. After the game, which ends in a 1-1 draw, news of Jodie's apparent kidnap of baby Jack reaches Danny and he and the rest of the players begin a hunt for his missing child. When Gina discovers a blanket in Jodie's car, she tells Fletch she thinks that Jodie might have Jack. Danny confronts Jodie and when she refuses to give Jack up, Lee and Hammo forcibly remove the baby from her. Furious at her actions, Danny demands that Viv should have Frank transferred out of Harchester.
8.28	"Fear And Loathing"	Rachel Flowerday	May 1, 2005
Ryan finally receives the all-clear that he can return to full training following his broken leg. However, he is still plagued by memories of the said horrific injury he sustained when training for England. After losing to Brighton & Hove Albion, again, Viv drops Frank and Danny for the crucial match against Wigan Athletic and intends to bring in both Ryan and Carl, though Carl has problems of his own, as he seems to be developing a drinking problem. Ryan finds solace in Carl's daughter, Savannah, and there's an attractive spark already between them, but when Carl spots them together, he flips out and knocks Ryan down to the ground. Fortunately, Ryan does not sustain any further damage and makes a psychological breakthrough. Both players start the game against Wigan and are inspirational in giving them an early lead. Guest star: Rebecca Loos as Naomi Wyatt
8.29	"Ten Green Bottles"	Lewis Georgeson & Jesse O'Mahoney	May 8, 2005
An important away win at Watford, their fourth in a row, has left Harchester needing just a draw in their final match to secure a play-off place. The match however is at home to West Ham United, and former manager Barker is now director of football there. Barker gets into a waiting taxi to find Fletch inside and presenting him with a briefcase full of cash, he proposes that Fletch helps Harchester lose the upcoming match. Fletch initially refuses and Barker responds by trying to offload him to Queens Park Rangers next season. Eventually, Fletch caves in to Barker's proposition and Barker reveals that the plan will work by spiking Ryan's water bottle with eye drops. Still unsure over the plot, Fletch instead tries to get the match abandoned by starting a fire in a stadium cupboard, but only succeeds in delaying the kick-off. When the players return to the dressing room, Ryan has no time to drink out of the water bottle offered by Fletch before they are due out on the pitch. Later, complaining of a headache, Gina is taken into the dressing room by Jodie for some quiet time where she unwittingly drinks from the tampered bottle, and shortly afterwards, she collapses and falls unconscious. Guest star: Ian Holloway as himself
8.30	"Caught In A Trap"	Jesse O'Mahoney & Rachel Flowerday	May 15, 2005
The players return to the dressing room leading 2-0 at half-time to find Gina lifeless on the floor. As she is rushed to hospital with a concerned Fletch by her side, disaster nearly strikes for Harchester as they fall 3-2 down before Ryan scores in stoppage time to secure the point they need to take the last play-off place. During the second half, Barker plants a bottle of cyanide in Fletch's bag and Gina's collapse soon becomes a criminal investigation. As Fletch is soon taken in by the police for questioning, Jodie discovers the money in Barker's hotel room and realises what is going on but when Barker corners her, she is unable to answer the phone that could get Fletch off the hook. Although realising he's been stitched up, Fletch is charged with Gina's attempted murder.
8.31	"The Day Before Tomorrow"	Jesse O'Mahoney & Rachel Flowerday	May 22, 2005
Both Harchester and West Ham win their respective semi-final ties to set up a mouthwatering final at Cardiff's Millennium Stadium. As he prepares to leave Harchester for good, Barker pens a letter to the entire team, intending to reveal some of the darker secrets that have led to the team's success. Before leaving for Cardiff, Viv and the rest of the team, at Gina's request, raise the money to bail Fletch out of prison but it is too late for him to be included in the squad for the big match. Dean though invites him to watch the match from the stands and before they head off, Fletch has one last look at the club, and in a shock turn of events, so too is Barker. A furious Fletch chases him down into the dressing room and a violent scuffle soon ensues, that ends with Barker, accidentally, impaling Fletch on a coat hanger. Realising he has murdered the club's biggest legend, Barker quickly throws together a plan to cover his tracks that results in him storing Fletch's dead body in the boot of his car. Meanwhile, in Cardiff, the team is given Barker's poisoned letter and soon realise that Ryan's affair with Chelsea is included in it but before they can remove it from Viv's room, he has learned the sickening truth... Final appearance of: Karl Fletcher
8.32	"Play-Off"	Jesse O'Mahoney & Rachel Flowerday	May 29, 2005
It's the day of the Play-Off final and Ryan desperately tries to stay well away from Viv, realising that he knows his secret. As the coach arrives at the stadium, Ryan makes a run for it and steals Barker's unattended BMW in the process whilst Viv berates the rest of the players for keeping Ryan's affair under wraps. Back at the hotel, Ryan tells Savannah what he has done and she convinces him to return to the stadium, but on the way, they encounter traffic and are pulled over by police for speeding, and Fletch's body is discovered in the boot. Ryan is taken away for questioning and there is now no chance of him playing in the match. Later, when Barker realises his car has gone missing, he berates the stewards for not doing their job properly before crumpling to the ground after suffering another heart attack. At half-time, news of Fletch's death filters to the players and Dean is left to console to a distraught Gina. West Ham dominate the second half but have two goals chalked off for offside, as Harchester hang on to win 1-0 through a Lee Presley penalty and promotion back to the Premiership at the first attempt. Dean leaves Gina's side to celebrate with the lads whilst Barker leaves the stadium's medical room after realising what has happened, and as he returns to the car park, he quickly realises that the police have pinpointed him as Fletch's killer. Determined not to go down for it, he locks himself inside his car before driving head on towards the Harchester coach with most of the team onboard. Both vehicles explode on impact in a huge fireball, killing Barker instantly and leaving much of the squad in a deadly peril... Final appearances of: Carl Caskey, Curtis Alexander, Dean Boyle, Don Barker, Frank Stone, Gina Moliano, Jodie Stone, Lee Presley and Vivian "Jaws" Wright; Note: This episode was aired to coincide with the Football League's Play-Off Final weekend in real life.
