= SeNSS =

Consortium of ten United Kingdom universities

The South East Network for Social Sciences (SeNSS) is a consortium of ten universities in the UK. All pioneers and world leaders in social-science research, knowledge production and training, the universities cooperate under ESRC to provide funding, expertise and an arena for Social Science and Economics researchers; their ESRC funding was announced in August 2016 after SeNSS's 2015 foundation. In 2016, SAGE Publishing revealed that it would begin a partnership with SeNSS.

== Member institutions ==
SeNSS members are:

- City, University of London
- University of East Anglia
- University of Essex (the co-ordinating institution)
- Goldsmiths, University of London
- University of Kent
- University of Reading
- University of Roehampton, London
- Royal Holloway, University of London
- University of Surrey
- University of Sussex

== Activities ==
The SeNSS is funded by the ESRC and provides funding for PhD students in the social sciences, training and workshops as well as a yearly conference. SeNSS also provides post-doctoral fellowships, placements and researcher support; SeNSS started accepting applicants in 2017.

SeNSS focuses on providing inter-disciplinary research training through engaging its scholars with expertise drawn from different scholarly fields.
