= Dean Holness =

English footballer and actor (born 1976)

Personal information
- Full name: Dean Thomas Holness
- Date of birth: 25 July 1976 (age 50)
- Place of birth: Lewisham, England
- Position: Midfielder

Senior career*
Years	Team	Apps	(Gls)
- Dulwich Hamlet
- Umeå
2001	Southend United	2	(0)
2005	Fisher Athletic		
2006–200?	Banstead Athletic		
- * Club domestic league appearances and goals

Dean Thomas Holness (born 25 July 1976) is an English former professional footballer, sports choreographer and actor best known for his roles as Campbell Hooper in Dream Team and as Danny in Mike Bassett: England Manager. Holness played as a midfielder, and started out with Dulwich Hamlet and Swedish side Umeå, before making two appearances in the Football League with Southend United. He then dropped into non-League football with Fisher Athletic and Banstead Athletic. In 2012 Dean founded the sports choreography company sportsfilms, working with leading brands on sports advertising campaigns for TV and film, and in 2018 Dean wrote the book 'So you want to be a footballer' a guide to what it takes to become a professional footballer in England. With interviews from his former team mates and other professional footballers, managers and coaches within the professional game, it's available on Amazon.

== Acting career ==
Holness appeared in Sky1 television drama Dream Team as Campbell Hooper in 25 episodes during series four. In 2001, Holness played Danny in comedy film Mike Bassett: England Manager. He also featured in television adverts for McDonald's in 2004.

== Football career ==
Holness had spells with Dulwich Hamlet and Swedish team Umeå. He signed a short 3 month contract with Southend United in July 2001. Former Southend player Andy Ansah recommended Holness to manager David Webb after spending time with him in Brazil filming Mike Bassett: England Manager. Holness made two appearances for Southend in the Third Division. His first appearance was in Southend's 1–0 home win over Darlington, being replaced at half-time as a substitute for Mark Rawle. His second and final appearance for Southend was on 27 August, away against Luton Town in the 2–0 defeat, when he came on as a substitute for Daniel Webb in the 85th minute.

In March 2005, Holness signed for Southern League Division One East club Fisher Athletic, before signing for Banstead Athletic in 2006, who played in the Isthmian League First Division.
