= Lamorna (disambiguation) =

Lamorna is a fishing village and cove in west Cornwall, United Kingdom.

Other uses for Lamorna include:

- "Lamorna" (folk song)

People

- Lamorna Ash, an English writer
- Samuel John Birch, AKA Lamorna Birch (1869–1955), an English artist
- Lamorna Watts, an English actress
