= The Man Who Knew Too Much =

The Man Who Knew Too Much may refer to:

== Film and television ==
- The Man Who Knew Too Much (1934 film), a film by Alfred Hitchcock starring Leslie Banks and Edna Best
- The Man Who Knew Too Much (1956 film), a film by Alfred Hitchcock starring James Stewart and Doris Day

=== Television episodes ===
- "The Man Who Knew Too Much", 2point4 children series 6, episode 5 (1996)
- "The Man Who Knew Too Much", Cluedo (Australian) series 1, episode 4 (1992)
- "The Man Who Knew Too Much", Dream Team series 8, episode 13 (2005)
- "The Man Who Knew Too Much", Monster episode 60 (2005)
- "The Man Who Knew Too Much", Stark Raving Mad episode 2 (2000)
- "The Man Who Knew Too Much", Supernatural, season 6, episode 22 (2011)
- "The Man Who Knew Too Much", Tom Stone season 1, episode 6 (2002)

== Literature ==
=== Fiction ===
- "The Man Who Knew Too Much", a 1921 pulp story by John D. Swain; first published in the December 1921 issue of Black Mask magazine
- The Man Who Knew Too Much (book), a 1922 collection of detective stories by G. K. Chesterton
- The Man Who Knew Too Much, a 1955 Sexton Blake story by W. Howard Baker; published as #350 in The Sexton Blake Library (Series 3)
- The Man Who Knew Too Much: A Moral Tale from the Baila of Zambia, a 1994 children's book by Julius Lester
- "The Man Who Knew Too Much", a 2006 short story by Alan Dean Foster; featured in the 2019 collection The Flavors of Other Worlds

=== Non-fiction ===
- The Man Who Knew Too Much, a 1992 book by Dick Russell concerning Richard Case Nagell
- "The Man Who Knew Too Much" (article), a 1996 Vanity Fair article by Marie Brenner about Jeffrey Wigand
- The Man Who Knew Too Much: The Inventive Life of Robert Hooke, 1635-1703, published in the US as The Forgotten Genius, a 2003 book by Stephen Inwood
- The Man Who Knew Too Much: Alan Turing and the Invention of the Computer, a 2005 book by David Leavitt
- Alfred Hitchcock: The Man Who Knew Too Much, a 2015 biography by Michael Wood
- The Man Who Knew Too Much, a 2016 monograph by Murray Pomerance concerning the 1956 film; part of the BFI Film Classics line
- Satyajit Ray: The Man Who Knew Too Much, a 2022 non-fiction book by Barun Chanda concerning the eponymous Indian filmmaker

== Other uses ==
- "The Man That Knew Too Much", a 2007 song by Silverchair from Young Modern
- The Man Who Knew Too Much (collection), a 2005 fashion collection by British designer Alexander McQueen
- The Man Who Knew Too Much, a 2020 documentary film concerning the life of Colin Wallace, a British former Army Intelligence member and specialist in psychological warfare

=== Television episodes with title plays ===
- "The Man Who Flew Too Much", The Simpsons season 36, episode 12 (2024)
- "The Man Who Grew Too Much", The Simpsons season 25, episode 12 (2014)
- "The Bird Who Knew Too Much", The Avengers season 5, episode 5 (1967)
- "The Cat Who Knew Too Much", The Sylvester & Tweety Mysteries season 1, episode 1 (1995)
- "The Chan Who Knew Too Much", Jackie Chan Adventures season 2, episode 34 (2002)
- "The Chicken Who Knew Too Much", Pole Position episode 3 (1984)
- "The Corpse Who Knew Too Much", Tucker's Witch episode 3 (1982)
- "The Dog Who Knew Too Much", Empty Nest season 3, episode 17 (1991)
- "The Dog Who Knew Too Much", Hart to Hart season 5, episode 15 (1984)
- "The Dog Who Knew Too Much", Milo Murphy's Law season 2, episode 13b (2018)
- "The Dog Who Knew Too Much", Road Rovers episode 6 (1996)
- "The Duck Who Knew Too Much", DuckTales (1987) season 4, episode 3 (1990)
- "The Frog Who Knew Too Much", Muppet Babies (1984) season 4, episode 12 (1987)
- "The Jedi Who Knew Too Much", Star Wars: The Clone Wars episode
- "The Lounge Singer Who Knew Too Much", Fame (1982) season 6, episode 20 (1987)
- "The Maid Who Knew Too Much", Devious Maids season 4, episode 6 (2016)
- "The Man Who Knew Too Much About Bridges", A Man on the Inside episode 2 (2024)
- "The Man Who Knows Too Much", Mr. Queen episode 4 (2020)
- "The Mandrill Who Knew Too Much", Captain Simian & the Space Monkeys episode 24 (1997)
- "The Men Who Knew Too Much, Part 1" and "Part 2", Perfect Strangers season 6, episodes 7–8 (1990)
- "The Minh Who Knew Too Much", King of the Hill season 12, episode 8 (2007)
- "The Mom Who Knew Too Much", Growing Pains season 3, episode 17 (1988)
- "The Parrot Who Knew Too Much", Ace Ventura: Pet Detective season 1, episode 4 (1996)
- "The Ram Who Knew Too Much", Willy Nilly series 1, episode 4 (2001)
- "The Wife Who Knew Too Much", American Justice season 9, episode 17 (2000)
- "The Woman Who Knew Too Much", Search Party season 2, episode 2 (2016)

== See also ==
- The Boy Who Knew Too Much (disambiguation)
- The Girl Who Knew Too Much (disambiguation)
- The Man Who Knew Too Little, a 1997 film
