= The Girl Who Knew Too Much =

The Girl Who Knew Too Much may refer to:

== Film ==
- The Girl Who Knew Too Much (1963 film), an Italian film directed by Mario Bava
- The Girl Who Knew Too Much (1969 film), an American film starring Adam West

== Literature ==
- The Girl Who Knew Too Much, a 1936 Sexton Blake novel by John G. Brandon
- The Girl Who Knew Too Much, a 1997 novel by Margaret Pemberton
- The Girl Who Knew Too Much, a 2017 historical novel by Jayne Ann Krentz under the pen name Amanda Quick

== Television ==
- "The Girl Who Knew Too Much", Teen Wolf season 3, episode 9 (2013)
- "The Girl Who Knew Too Much", The First 48 season 13, episode 14a (2013)
- "The Girl Who Knew Too Much", The United States Steel Hour season 7, episode 17 (1960)

== See also ==
- The Boy Who Knew Too Much (disambiguation)
- The Man Who Knew Too Much (disambiguation)
