= Mike Bassett: Manager =

British television comedy series

- Written by: John R. Smith; Rob Sprackling
- Directed by: Martin Dennis
- Starring: Ricky Tomlinson; Amanda Redman; Steve Edge; Dan Renton Skinner; Tim Barlow; Neil Maskell; Michael Fenton Stevens
- Opening theme: Gravity by Embrace
- Country of origin: United Kingdom
- No. of series: 1
- No. of episodes: 6

Production
- Producers: Steve Barron, Peter La Terriere, Luc Roeg, Tom Berington, Johnny Smith, Rob Sprackling
- Editor: Paul Machliss
- Running time: 30 minutes

Original release
- Network: ITV
- Release: 29 September – 3 November 2005

Mike Bassett: Manager is a British television comedy series by Steve Barron. It is a follow-up to the 2001 film Mike Bassett: England Manager, and stars Ricky Tomlinson, Steve Edge, Amanda Redman and Dan Renton Skinner. The film follows Mike Bassett who after leading England to the World Cup semi-finals in 2002 has seen his career decline as he decides to postpone his retirement in Spain to take over as manager of EFL League Two side Wirral County, the team for whom his father was a club legend.

The show ran for one series of six episodes and was first shown on 29 September 2005 on ITV. In 2014, there were plans to bring Mike Bassett back to the big screen in a movie titled "Mike Bassett: Interim Manager." However, a kickstarter project that was essential for raising funds for the film did not meet its target, essentially making the series the final instalment.

== Premise ==
The series is a sequel to the film Mike Bassett: England Manager, in which Bassett, having won the Mr Clutch Cup with second-tier side Norwich City, takes over England following the previous manager's heart attack. Despite failing to win any of the final three qualifiers, England reach the World Cup finals, held in Brazil. After drawing with Egypt, a 4–0 defeat to Mexico, captain Gary Wackett being sent home for hooliganism and Bassett being pictured in a drunken incident, he is expected to resign, but instead inspires England to victory over Argentina. England reach the semi-finals, before being knocked out by eventual winners Brazil.

The series picks up some time after Mike Bassett took England to the semi-finals of a fictional 2002 World Cup. The side failed to qualify for the 2004 European Championships, losing to lowly Liechtenstein during the campaign, resulting in Bassett being sacked. Since then, a spell at Newcastle ended in similar fashion after a double relegation, while his returns to former clubs Norwich and then Colchester fared little better. Mike decides to retire and is set to move to Spain, but at the last minute is offered the manager's job at Wirral County F.C., for whom his father was a player.

== Cast ==
=== Main cast ===
- Ricky Tomlinson as Mike Bassett, the former England manager who's struggled since returning from the 2002 World Cup and has since been sacked by Newcastle, Norwich and Colchester.
- Steve Edge as Doddsy, Bassett's assistant coach who is a sycophantic yes man.
- Amanda Redman as Karine Bassett, Mike's long suffering but faithful wife whose patience is often put to the test.
- Dan Renton Skinner as Kevin Tonkinson, A Geordie former England international player who is an alcoholic and has since found himself playing in the lower leagues. He is based on Paul Gascoigne as per his spells with Boston United at the time.
- Tim Barlow as Sir Denzil, the supportive but elderly chairman of Wirral County Football Club, who suffers a heart attack in the first episode.
- Michael Fenton Stevens as Richard Johnson, the managing director of the club who often schemes against Mike and attempts to sell the land on the stadium to a Norwegian furniture chain.
- Neil Maskell as Wirral Web Presenter, the presenter of the Wirral web show and the most prominent figure in the press conferences.
- Adam Tedder as Laszlo Vig, the psychotic Serbian goalkeeper of Wirral who is said to be wanted for war crimes.
- Kobna Holdbrook-Smith as Carlton 'Doors' Dawes, seen as the best player on the team.
- Gareth Mason as Gavin James, the heavily overweight player who Mike is unable to drop from the team because his father is the owner of Wirral Rubbish, the team's shirt sponsor.
- David Gyasi as Jeremy Hands, a well educated player who has vast tactical knowledge of the game but is often ridiculed by Doddsy as a "know it all" despite him always being right.
- Richard Bennett as Wrighty.

=== Guest ===
- Mark van Eeuwen as Ronnie Van Needlemans, a Dutch player who Mike is convinced to sign believing him to be a top striker featured in a scouting video, he turns out to be the goalkeeper in the video.
- Jordan Long as Spike, Tonkinson's best friend who is seen as a bad influence on him by Mike. He is based on "Jimmy Five Bellies", Paul Gascoigne's best friend.
- Robin Kermode as Dr. Moss

=== Cameos ===
- Jeff Stelling as himself, presenter of Sky Sports Soccer Saturday.
- Jimmy Greaves as himself.
- Lucy Meacock as herself, a newsreader.

== Episodes ==
No.	Title	Original release date
1	"Football's Coming Home"	29 September 2005
It is revealed that Bassett was axed by England after failing to qualify for the 2004 European Championships (although the film was released a year after the tournament ended, in which England did qualify for it). He then took over Newcastle, where he was sacked after back to back relegations, before an unsuccessful return to Norwich. Then sacked by Colchester, Mike Bassett heeds the call to manage his boyhood club, Wirral County. After persuading his wife Karine to forego a sun kissed retirement on the Costa Del Sol, Bassett gears up for a final shot at glory in Ellesmere Port. Things get off to a bad start when the team concedes a goal in less than ten seconds to Torquay United, causing the chairman to have a heart attack.
2	"Going Dutch"	6 October 2005
After a terrible start to the league campaign, Bassett tries to turn the club's fortunes around. He uses his own money without Karine knowing to sign up and coming Dutch striker Ronnie Van Needlemans, after watching him score several goals on a video sent by his agent. However, Van Needlemans is not the striker from the video but rather the goalkeeper. Meanwhile, an argument with the side's regular keeper, Lazlo Vig, played by Adam Tedder, results in him receiving a concussion that rules him out for the rest of the season.
3	"Flat Pack Four"	13 October 2005
Bassett employs a hypnotist to help break his star striker's goal drought. In the next game he scores a hat trick of own goals. Bassett also realises that the club may be taken over by a cheap Ikea knock off. The hypnotist is called upon to hypnotise the buyer into making a mockery of Wirral, telling the press people in attendance to see his "Norwegian arse" and therefore get himself chased out of town.
4	"Return of the Paralytic Son"	20 October 2005
With Wirral County looking doomed, the fans turn on Bassett wanting results or his head. Not only that but former England wonder kid Kevin 'Tonka' Tonkinson (played by Dan Renton Skinner) turns up on his door step. With the help of Bassett and a cold shower a drunken Tonka leads Wirral to a 2–1 victory over Wycombe Wanderers despite the death of his wife in a car llama incident hours earlier.
5	"Seven Brothers for Seven Brothers"	27 October 2005
Following a glorious winning streak, reformed alcoholic Tonka has lifted Wirral County out of the relegation zone. Along with his brilliance on the pitch, he also causes the relegation rivals Mansfield Town's bus to crash and injure most of their squad. Bassett then finds out Tonka is going on a stag night, and to keep his star man off the drink, Bassett drinks all the spiked drinks himself. In the process, he injures Tonka when he punches him to the ground, putting him out for the rest of the season. Having by this time missed his son Jason's drama school showcase, Mike returns home to find Karine has left him.
6	"Abide With Me"	3 November 2005
With Karine gone for two months, Wirral look set to go down after a dismal run following Tonka's injury. Mike then finds out that his father took a bribe in the 1956 FA Cup Final for money to help fix Mike's legs as a boy and allow him to play football. With this to spur him on, he reunites with Karine and heads to the Wirral County ground. After a passionate speech to players, fans and reporters, Wirral must get a better result than Mansfield Town to avoid relegation (barring an improbable defeat for York City), and with Tonka playing despite his injuries they stay up. Wirral's last game is an intimidating match versus local rivals Chester City, who need a win in order to secure a play off spot. In the end, Chester beat Wirral 2–0, but Mansfield lose 6–1, allowing Wirral to survive on goal difference. After this, Mike leaves the club in Doddsy's hands and sets off to Spain with Karine, though a deliberately ambiguous ending suggests that he might stay yet.

=== Bottom of the Final Table ===
Before Final Match:

Pos.	Team	Pld	Pts	GD
22	York City	45	44	–26
23	Mansfield Town	45	41	–34
24	Wirral County	45	41	-36

After Final Match:

Pos.	Team	Pld	Pts	GD
23	Wirral County	46	41	–38
24	Mansfield Town	46	41	–39

No reference is made to the result of the match involving York City, but with both Wirral County and Mansfield Town both losing they were safe.

== Production ==
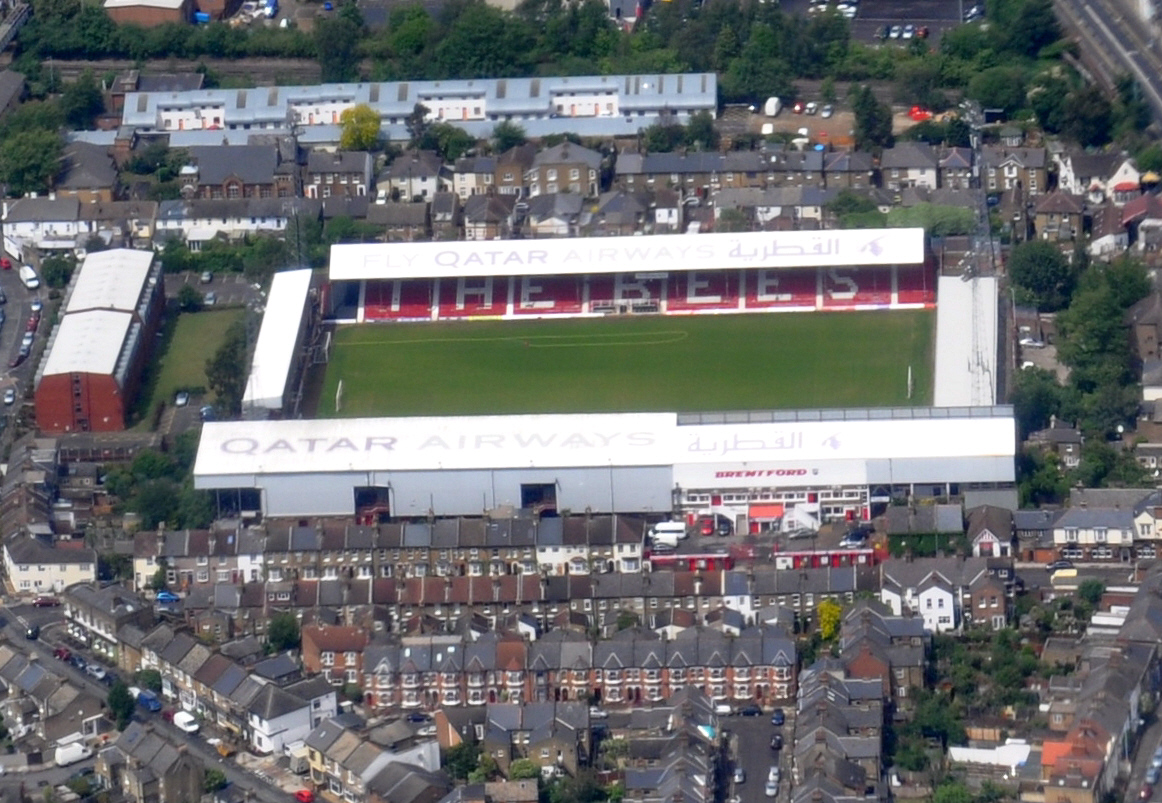
Brentford's Griffin Park was used as Wirral County's stadium.

In 2003, a pilot episode was shot using Bradley Walsh as Doddsy, the role he played in the film. However when the producers of the movie demanded a higher percentage of royalties, the project was delayed for two years. As a result of this when the series began filming Walsh was no longer available and the role was given to Steve Edge. Of the four returning characters, only Ricky Tomlinson and Amanda Redman reprised their roles with Dan Renton Skinner taking on the role of Kevin Tonkinson, as played by Dean Lennox Kelly in the movie.

Despite being based in Ellesmere Port, filming for all football scenes and exterior shots of Wirral County's stadium were shot in London using Brentford's Griffin Park stadium.

== See also ==
- Dream Team, a British TV series featuring the on and off the field affairs of fictional Premier League club Harchester United.
- Ted Lasso, an Apple TV series featuring an American football coach who is appointed as manager of a Premier League side, despite having no experience in association football.
