= Adam Tedder =

British actor, singer-songwriter and musician

- Born: Beeston. Nottinghamshire, England
- Occupation(s): Actor, singer, songwriter
- Years active: 1989–present
- Website: www.adamtedder.com

Adam Tedder is a British actor, singer-songwriter and multi-instrumentalist musician, working in stage, film, television and radio.

== Early life ==
Tedder was born in Beeston, Nottinghamshire. He attended Bramcote Hills Grammar school, and Guildford School of Acting.

== Career ==
He is best known for playing Laszlo Vig, the psychotic Serbian war criminal goalkeeper, in Mike Bassett: Manager for ITV1. His debut double A side single, "It’ll Be Soon" and "Eastern Girls" received much critical acclaim. His inspired live performances have been compared to that of a grandiose Jeff Buckley. His portrayal of The Big Bopper in the West End and Broadway hit Buddy – The Buddy Holly Story was described by musical director Paul Dury as the best he'd seen internationally.

He most recently filmed Oranges and Sunshine with Emily Watson and Hugo Weaving, and Closed Circuit with Eric Bana and Rebecca Hall.

His other stage credits include Blood Brothers at the Phoenix Theatre, seasons at the Chichester Festival Theatre and The Royal Shakespeare Company and international tours of Joseph and the Amazing Technicolor Dreamcoat and South Pacific.

Amongst other roles, he played Inspector Keightley in The IPCRESS File on BBC Radio 4, adapted by Mike Walker.
