= Federal University of Surrey =

The Federal University of Surrey was an English university body which existed from 2000 to 2004. It was a federation between two institutions; the University of Surrey (UniS), and the University of Surrey Roehampton (USR).

== History ==
The University of Surrey, based in Guildford, first validated courses for the Roehampton Institute of Higher Education in Roehampton, London in 1980 and in 1998 the two institutions decided to form an academic federation. The body was officially formed on 14 January 2000 between the two institutions and as part of the merger, Roehampton Institute was renamed University of Surrey, Roehampton.

In October 2003, the University of Surrey Roehampton announced that it would submit an application for independent university title to the Department for Education and Skills, and the application was submitted on 18 March 2004. The name chosen was Roehampton University. The application was considered by the Privy Council and, on 23 June 2004, it was announced that Roehampton was to be granted university status in its own right from 31 July 2004. Thus, on 1 August 2004, the federal university was dissolved with the University of Surrey Roehampton becoming Roehampton University. The two universities continue to support collaborative activities.

== Sports ==
During the years of the Federal University, the sports teams from the component institutions competed with each other in various disciplines at the Federal Sports Day. In all there were three events held, the first in 2002 was declared a draw but the teams from Guildford came out on top in the 2003 and 2004 events.
