= The Boy Who Knew Too Much =

The Boy Who Knew Too Much may refer to:

- The Boy Who Knew Too Much, a 1977 novel by Roderic Jeffries
- "The Boy Who Knew Too Much" (The Simpsons), a 1994 episode of The Simpsons
- "The Boy Who Knew Too Much", episode five of the 2001 Australian children's television series Escape of the Artful Dodger
- The Boy Who Knew Too Much (album), a 2009 album by Mika

== See also ==
- "The Man Who Grew Too Much", a 2014 episode of The Simpsons
- The Girl Who Knew Too Much (disambiguation)
- The Man Who Knew Too Much (disambiguation)
