= Dream Team series 9 =

Dream Team
- Series 9
- No. of episodes: 31

Release
- Original network: Sky One
- Original release: October 16, 2005 – May 14, 2006

Series chronology
- ← Previous; Series 8 Next → Series 10

The ninth series of Dream Team was broadcast on Sky1 from October 2005 to May 2006. It followed the story of the fictional Harchester United in their first season back in the Premiership after winning promotion at the end of the previous season.

Series nine of Dream Team saw the programme undergo a major revamp in an attempt to stem the continuing decline of ratings in previous years. Various new characters were introduced, a new title sequence and remixed theme music were introduced, and more often dealt with storylines of a more grittier nature, that had first been explored towards the conclusion of the previous series. 31 episodes were produced in this series, one fewer than previous. This included a 90-minute feature-length special midway during the run as well as two episodes being shown back to back towards the conclusion of the series.

== Cast ==
Only Danny Sullivan, Ryan Naysmith and Darren Tyson remained from the playing squad of series 8, the latter of three becoming a main cast member for the first time. New characters included enigmatic brothers Casper and Eugene Rose, Liam Mackay, physio Ashleigh King, secretary Amy Kerrigan and football agent Chloe Tyler. Lynda Block also returned to the series after a three-year absence, though had made guest appearances in series 6 and 7 beforehand.

=== Main cast ===
- Jamie Lomas as Alex Dempsey
- Lucinda Kennard as Amy Kerrigan
- Naomi Ryan as Ashleigh King
- Robert Kazinsky as Casper Rose
- Julie Healy as Chloe Tyler
- Danny Husbands as Danny Sullivan
- Darren White as Darren Tyson
- Junior Nunoo as Eugene Rose
- Joachim Raaf as Felix Hahn
- Jonathan Howard as Gavin Moody
- Pedro Cunha as Hector Briganza
- Duncan Pow as Liam Mackay
- Alison King as Lynda Block
- Ricky Whittle as Ryan Naysmith
- Lauren Gold as Scarlett Rose

=== Supporting cast ===
- Jessica Jane as Cindi Marshall
- Natasha Symms as Kim Sullivan

In addition there were cameo appearances throughout the series by various Sky Sports News anchors as themselves. Kevin Keatings remained as match commentator for the fourth consecutive season.

== Episodes ==
| No. | Title | Written by | Original release date |
|---|---|---|---|
| 9.01 | "Phoenix From The Flames" | Ben Harris, Rachel Flowerday & Jane Hewland | October 16, 2005 |
News of the Harchester coach disaster quickly spreads and it is speculated that it was bomb that caused the explosion. That same day, former owner Lynda Block is paroled on early release from prison after just over two years for Prashant Dettani's murder in 2001 and heads to Cardiff upon hearing what has happened. The day's events are also explained by footballers Casper Rose, Eugene Rose and Liam Mackay - Casper is attending a house party and falls for a mysterious blonde girl, Eugene botches a robbery attempt and later turns up unannounced to a meeting between Liam, his agent and fiancée Chloe Tyler and QPR manager Ian Holloway over a potential transfer move for the following season. That night, Lynda arrives at the hospital to discover no one has survived the explosion and that only Danny Sullivan, Darren Tyson and Ryan Naysmith - all of whom weren't on the coach at the time - are still alive. Two months later, Lynda is introduced to new manager Felix Hahn after being invited to discuss the role of being reappointed as chief executive of the club. Felix begins rebuilding the club by purchasing Casper before Chelsea are able to make their move - though he insists on new club physio Ashleigh King delivering the contract in person. Eugene also signs with Liam being used as stopgap to allow Eugene's transfer to go through. All three new signings take their places at the memorial service to remember the victims of the coach disaster, but when Eugene finds Casper there, tempers immediately flare and Eugene heads over to confront his estranged brother, smashing a picture of the late Curtis Alexander in the process. First appearances of: Amy Kerrigan, Ashleigh King, Casper Rose, Chloe Tyler, Eugene Rose, Felix Hahn, Liam Mackay and Scarlett Rose.
| 9.02 | "Brotherly Love" | Jesse O'Mahoney | October 23, 2005 |
Eugene's actions bring the memorial service to an abrupt end and as Lynda reprimands him for his behaviour, the police show up to arrest him for burglary. Eugene's silence during the questioning lands his agent Chloe in trouble under suspicion of perverting the court of justice. The rest of the team, led by Casper, break into Studs bar, much to Ashleigh's disapproval and entire team is nowhere to be seen on the day of their opening Premier League fixture against Liverpool. It soon emerges that after leaving Studs, the team ended up on deserted beach in France. Ashleigh helps get them back home by giving directions to a nearby airfield and they make it back to the Dragons Lair in time. With the match still goalless, Eugene wins Harchester a penalty before arguing with his brother Casper over who should take it. Casper scores the penalty to give Harchester an emotional 1-0 win and the brothers appear together in the post-match press conference where Eugene vows to score more goals over the season than Casper. First appearance of: Gavin Moody
| 9.03 | "Women Trouble" | Jane Hewland, Ben Harris & Huw Kennair Jones | October 30, 2005 |
After their opening day win, Harchester lose their next three games to put early pressure on Felix. Following an argument with Felix, Ashleigh runs into Alex Dempsey, who informs her that he's been appointed as the first team coach. Ashleigh accuses the club of sacking her but Lynda reveals that she never signed the letter despite it having her signature. On the day of the Manchester City game, Liam, who has been left out of the matchday squad again, arranges an impromptu wedding ceremony for him and Chloe in their garden. That night, Casper attempts to get the bottom of the truth about Ashleigh's presence at the house party months ago, and it leads to Felix accusing Ashleigh of sleeping with Casper. Afterwards, Liam confronts Felix as to why he is being ignored, leading Felix to confess that he never wanted him at the club and he was only signed to bring Eugene in. First appearance of: Alex Dempsey
| 9.04 | "It's A Man's World" | Jane Hewland & Jesse O'Mahoney | November 6, 2005 |
Determined to bring their losing streak to an end, Felix arranges a training match between the first team squad, coached by Ashleigh, and the reserves, coached by Alex. Meanwhile, left furious by Felix's revelation, Liam looks at getting a move away from the club. The training match starts badly for the first team as Gavin Moody scores for the reserves, and Ashleigh responds by bringing Ryan off before re-emerging in the same party dress that Casper had seen her in previously for the team talk, berating them that they can't trust her because she's a woman. This wins the side over, and they go on to fightback in the second half to win, whilst in the players lounge, Ashleigh demands that Ryan admits he is out of form and that she can help him overcome his problems.
| 9.05 | "Marathon Man" | Ben Harris & Huw Kennair Jones | November 13, 2005 |
Charlton Athletic are the visitors to the Dragons Lair and Gavin is delighted when his performance in the training match earns him a place on the substitutes bench but Liam is annoyed to have again been left out. Determined to prove Felix wrong, Liam proceeds to run laps around the stadium for several hours, eventually collapsing through exhaustion, but gaining Felix's respect in the process. Meanwhile, Scarlett's worst nightmare becomes a reality when she ends up being trapped in a lift with Casper. Forced to strip off to cope with the intense heat, the pair are rescued by Eugene, who angrily storms off having got the wrong end of the situation.
| 9.06 | "Dreaming Of England" | Jane Hewland & Jesse O'Mahoney | November 20, 2005 |
Lynda informs Ryan that England manager Sven-Göran Eriksson will be in the stands for Harchester's next match at home to Arsenal. This prompts Ryan to have recurring dreams that tell him he's not good enough. On his birthday, he tries a fake an injury to get out of playing, and at Ashleigh's suggestion, Casper arranges a surprise in which he and the rest of the team have purchased Studs bar for his birthday. Ryan then wins a game of poker for dares in which he dares Casper to break into Eugene's house and get into bed with him and Scarlett. Casper injures himself whilst completing the dare, resulting in Ryan being selected for the match after Felix realises he wasn't injured after all. Ryan goes on to win the match for Harchester 1-0 and spends the night in Studs on his own, finally overcoming his nightmares.
| 9.07 | "What's Bugging Her?" | Rebecca Hobbs & Rachel Flowerday | November 27, 2005 |
A TV crew, commissioned by the club's mysterious owner Dragons Corp, is making a documentary on the club's rebuild. Under pressure to film an interview for the programme, Lynda believes the mystery owner is her ex-husband Jerry. She meets his son Jonathan, who informs him Jerry died years ago and Lynda is upset that she was never told about it. Meanwhile, Eugene is unable to shake off the thought of Scarlett having an affair with Casper, and Scarlett is later involved in a car accident that is overheard by Eugene using a listening device he secretly fitted inside her car. After the documentary is premiered, Lynda is inundated with offers for TV interviews, but the mystery of the club's owner remains unsolved when he does not show up to dinner that evening with her.
| 9.08 | "Who Wants To Be A Millionaire?" | Tom Chaplin & Bill Paris | December 4, 2005 |
Dragons Corp announce that if a Harchester player scores a winning goal in their upcoming Carling Cup tie against Leeds United, a £1 million prize will be awarded. Eugene is annoyed when Felix chooses to have Gavin make his debut in the match and offers to pay him to fake an injury. When Gavin's girlfriend, Cindi, is unable to take part in a photoshoot with Casper for the club's Christmas catalogue, Scarlett volunteers to take her place. On the day of the cup tie, the prize is doubled to £2 million and Lynda announces that the extra million will be donated to the families of the coach disaster. Casper limps out of the match early with a hamstring injury and heads back to The Grange with Scarlett. On the pitch, Harchester come from 2-1 down to win 3-2 with Eugene scoring the winning goal and the £1 million payout, much the annoyance of Lynda and the supporters. First appearance of: Cindi Marshall
| 9.09 | "He Was Robbed" | Rachel Flowerday | December 11, 2005 |
Paul Hankin writes an article on how Gavin was cheated out of winning the £1 million bonus by Eugene. Gavin is later offered a professional contract by Harchester, but Cindi mistakes this as having been fired by club and tells Hankin about how Eugene bribed him to take his place in the starting line-up. With the FA threatening to impose match bans on both players, Eugene agrees to give up the £1 million to charity, and as Gavin signs his pro contract, Eugene discovers Scarlett and Casper's photoshoot for the Christmas catalogue. With Scarlett deciding to leave Eugene over his behaviour, Eugene contacts Marlon, who suggests he can find people that would relieve him of the money.
| 9.10 | "'Tis The Season To Be Jolly" | Rebecca Hobbs | December 18, 2005 |
Eugene and Marlon plot a stage a fake raid to take away the £1 million and use Casper as a witness. On the night of the club's Christmas party, Marlon and his associate Lewis burst into Eugene's house and take Casper, Felix and Ashleigh hostage, but Eugene attempts to double-cross Marlon by only giving him £50,000. Casper calls Ryan to get help, whilst at the party, Gavin proposes to Cindi, unaware that she has made out with Ryan in the changing rooms. As the police arrive at the scene of the robbery, Lewis threatens to shoot Ashleigh only for Casper to take the bullet. Felix helps to end the siege by telling Eugene to pretend that he, Marlon and Lewis were all taken hostage by someone else.
| 9.11 | "War Of The Roses" | Jane Hewland & Jesse O'Mahoney | January 1, 2006 |
Casper is rushed to hospital following the siege and Eugene begs for him not to die. In a special flashback episode, the scene then goes back to 1994 when the brothers first met as 10-year olds at the Charlton Athletic academy. Related through estranged parents Terry Rose and Diane Christie, the pair quickly form a close bond with Casper being a Harchester supporter whilst Eugene idolises Liverpool, the club of his idol John Barnes. When Harchester are promoted to the Premiership for the first time during the 1994-95 season, Casper steals Terry's credit card and runs off with Eugene to see Harchester play Liverpool on New Year's Day 1995. After they are found by police and returned home, Eugene's mother Diane is run over and killed. Eugene goes on a downward spiral following Diane's death and becomes a troubled offender. After being caught in the act in an attempted robbery, Terry convinces his wife Julie to let Eugene stay with them and Casper, rekindling their relationship and the pair are later signed to Charlton as professional players. In 2000, Terry is diagnosed with leukaemia and is forced to confess all to Julie about being Eugene's biological father when he's a positive match for a bone marrow transplant. With Eugene closing in on a potential move to his boyhood club Liverpool, Casper confides in Eugene's girlfriend Jessica, who tells him she is pregnant with Eugene's baby. Casper takes revenge by convincing Jessica to have an abortion and on the day of Eugene's final match with Charlton before leaving the club, Casper stops the car on the way to the match and reveals to Eugene about Jessica's abortion, saying he either stops her or plays the match to get the Liverpool deal. Jessica goes through with the abortion and Eugene performs poorly in his farewell game for Charlton against Harchester, leading to him being substituted in favour of Casper. Enraged, Eugene physically assaults Casper as he walks off the pitch, and the brothers do not speak to each other again for the next four years. Back in the present day, Eugene is told by Julie that Casper is out of intensive care and will make a full recovery. Handing him a souvenir bag she found containing memories from when they went to see Harchester play Liverpool in 1995, Eugene goes into Casper's room at the hospital. Guest starring: John Barnes and Alan Curbishley as themselves Note: This was a special feature length episode running for 90 minutes.
| 9.12 | "Go!" | Ben Harris & Huw Kennair Jones | January 8, 2006 |
Felix receives a letter written with the similar handwriting of previous letters sent by the mystery owner, instructing him to resign. Amy briefs journalists that Felix will leave the club citing family issues in Germany but he states he won't leave unless he receives the compensation payment as written in his contract. Whilst Harchester play Manchester United in the first leg of their Carling Cup semi-final, Ashleigh discovers Felix's resignation letter on Lynda's desk and admits her true feelings for him. Felix reappears in the dugout for the second half, leaving Amy to reassure Dragons Corp that the situation will be dealt with. After the game, which Harchester win 2-1, Felix invites Ashleigh to move in with him, only to find the locks on his house changed, before his credit card is rejected when trying to check back into The Grange and his car is then repossessed. Believing that Amy is behind these events, Felix goes back to the club to confront her, and as a commotion breaks out, Amy rips her own dress and claims to Lynda that Felix is sexually attacking her.
| 9.13 | "Unleash Hell" | Jane Hewland & Jesse O'Mahoney | January 15, 2006 |
Felix is suspended whilst the club begins an investigation into Amy's allegations against him. Felix gives an exclusive interview to Sky News, prompting Amy to file a statement to the police. After Ashleigh lets slip that Amy is staying in the room next to her at The Grange, Felix asks for Amy to drop her accusations and he will leave in the club in return, but then realises that someone else is in the bathroom of her room and bangs on the door for them to come out, leading to a terrified Amy to call security and Felix is arrested. Chloe begins to suspect that Amy has a secret lover and before long discovers that she has been having an affair with Danny. Amy eventually confesses that her allegations were false, whilst her affair with Danny is also exposed. Felix turns down Lynda's offer to remain as manager for the sake of his children and leaves to return to Germany whilst Amy is fired from the club by Dragons Corp for her actions. Guest starring: Kay Burley as herself Final appearance of: Felix Hahn
| 9.14 | "The Man In The White Suit" | Lewis Georgeson & Bill Parris | January 22, 2006 |
Brazilian striker Hector Da Silva arrives at East Midlands Airport, as one of the hottest properties in the January transfer window. Wanting a move to England, his agent Jackson Turner is instead intent on selling him to a Russian club, and Lynda vows to help when he tells her of his plight. Following Felix's departure, Alex is placed in interim charge for the second leg of the Carling Cup semi-final away to Manchester United, but his game plans are thrown into disarray when Darren is bitten in the leg by Ryan's dog, Danny throws up on the coach after being hungover and Eugene also has to pull out of the match. Back at East Midlands Airport, Lynda stops Hector from leaving by reporting Jackson under suspicion for taking Hector out of the country against his will. As Customs Officers question both, it emerges Hector is not in country illegally if he stays on a visitor pass, allowing him to fire Jackson as his agent, preventing the Russia deal from going ahead. At Old Trafford, a goalless draw sends Harchester to the Carling Cup final, and that evening, Lawrie Hannigan accepts Lynda's offer to become the club's new manager and Lynda propositions to him that they sign Hector.
| 9.15 | "All Change" | Huw Kennair Jones & Jesse O'Mahoney | January 29, 2006 |
Harchester face a battle for the services of Hector with Bolton Wanderers, after their scout recommends him to be signed on a trial. New Harchester manager Lawrie Hannigan publicly slams Bolton in a press conference and Bolton are forced to cancel their deal when proof of Harchester's submissions for a work permit for Hector come through. As Danny continues to struggle to cope in the aftermath of his affair being exposed, Amy tries to help him see straight that he shouldn't be punishing himself for his actions, and Lynda later re-hires Amy after her replacement leaves work early. During a welcome party for Lawrie, in which Hector is formally unveiled as the club's new signing, a mysterious car pulls up outside whilst Lawrie is smoking a cigarette and by the following morning, he is nowhere to be seen. In Lawrie's absence, his assistant Vincent Burns takes charge with the help of Alex and Ashleigh and Hector scores on his debut against, ironically, Bolton.
| 9.16 | "The New Testament" | Ben Harris, Jane Hewland & Jesse O'Mahoney | February 5, 2006 |
Vincent Burns quits following Lawrie's disappearance and Lynda believes that he was murdered by Russian henchmen in revenge for the club signing Hector. Alex is again placed in interim charge and Lynda assures him the job will be his permanently if he wins three of the next four matches. At Studs, Casper plays a wind up stunt by making Alex drink a strong liquor cocktail and Alex awakens the next morning naked and tied to a chair in the middle of the pitch! The club's mystery owner informs Lynda in a note left inside her new car that he paid Hector's transfer fee personally so that both their lives could be spared. On the evening before Harchester's match with Everton, Lynda personally wishes Alex good luck and he responds with advice that was written on the note beforehand, leading Lynda to suspect that Alex is the mystery owner.
| 9.17 | "The Special One" | Lewis Georgeson & Jesse O'Mahoney | February 12, 2006 |
Hector plays poorly against Everton due to being ill, but Eugene and Casper give Harchester a 2-1 win. After the match, Lynda fires Alex and as he clears his desk, Lynda shows him the letter which Alex says he knows nothing about. The pair travel to Stockport where Alex reveals a stack of letters from many years ago, all with the same handwriting of the mystery owner. At Ashleigh's insistence, Hector moves in with Ryan at Studs to try and clean up his image, but has trouble getting acquainted at the place, particularly with Ryan's dog Jaws. Alex's old youth coach Barry Boothroyd tells him that his injury as a player at Sheffield Wednesday led to him being offloaded and cannot lie to him on whether he would have been a good enough player. This deeply affects Alex, who spends the entire night in the dugout, and come the match against local rivals West Bromwich Albion, he keeps the team talk to a minimum and Harchester run out comfortable 4-0 winners. That night, Lynda finds Alex alone in the gym and the two kiss, but Alex pulls away, still unsteady over the kind of influence he's being put under by the mystery owner.
| 9.18 | "Truth" | Ben Harris, Jane Hewland & Jesse O'Mahoney | February 19, 2006 |
Eugene's trial arrives and Liam is torn over the prospect of potentially having to lie in court to prevent both Eugene and his wife Chloe from being convicted. Lynda tries to get Liam on side by getting Alex to play Liam in the Chelsea match - before facing the same opposition in the Carling Cup final a week later. With Alex's mind still very much elsewhere, the team is confused by the tactics and formations he selects, with players completely out of their usual positions. Alex then leaves Ashleigh in charge and despite taking the lead, Harchester collapse in the second half to lose 4-1. A despondent Ashleigh hands in a resignation letter, which Lynda rejects, saying that her job as First Team Coach is safe regardless of whoever is appointed as the permanent manager, before reminding Alex that the team needs him, particularly with the cup final the following week. Back at Eugene's trial, and just as Liam is about to take to the stand, news emerges that Marlon is changing his testimony by saying that both he and Eugene carried out the robbery together.
| 9.19 | "Just Another Game" | Lewis Georgeson & Jesse O'Mahoney | February 26, 2006 |
The Carling Cup final arrives with Harchester returning to the Millennium Stadium, barely nine months since the coach explosion. The three survivors of that fateful day - Danny, Darren and Ryan - are overcome with emotion when they return to the exact spot where their teammates died. Back at Eugene's trial, Liam initially sticks to the statement given by Casper but cracks under cross-examination, giving Eugene's chances of being acquitted a huge blow. As the cup final begins, Harchester struggle to cope with one of Chelsea's star players Asa Maloin, and he brings down Hector with a bad tackle and only receives a yellow card despite taking Hector out of the game, Liam is left furious by this and is also booked for protesting. Harchester take the lead but in the second half, Liam brings down Asa in a reckless tackle and is sent off as Asa is stretchered off with what appears to be an horrific injury. Chelsea soon equalise through Didier Drogba and an unfortunate own goal from Danny gives them the Carling Cup. Despite the disappointment, the players conclude they honoured the memory of their late teammates and Casper vows they will return in May for the FA Cup final, whilst Lynda confirms to Alex he will now be manager on a permanent basis despite falling short in the promise of three wins from four. After the final, Eugene's trial continues in which his estranged wife Scarlett is called to testify, where she backs up Chloe's story and believes that Marlon is implicating Eugene out of jealously. Note: This episode's airdate coincided with the 2006 Carling Cup final in real life, which took place earlier that day.
| 9.20 | "Five Steps" | Lewis Georgeson & Bill Paris | March 5, 2006 |
After five days of deliberation, Eugene is acquitted by the jury and outside the court, he is approached by an Australian journalist who informs him that because his former girlfriend Jessica gave birth to their child in Sydney, he is eligible to be selected for Australia at the 2006 FIFA World Cup. Jessica later returns to confirm that the story is true because she never went through with the abortion years ago and Eugene is introduced to his estranged daughter Lucy. Jessica tells Casper that the Australian television network who discovered the story paid for her flight home and that it was time Lucy knew who her real father was and Casper promises Eugene that he knew nothing about Jessica deciding to keep her child. Meanwhile, Liam's tackle on Asa Maloin in the Carling Cup final has ended the latter's playing career and Asa is considering taking out criminal proceedings against Liam. Later, when Liam is being interviewed by legal services over the case, Chloe confronts Alex in his room at The Grange, and the pair are soon kissing each other!
| 9.21 | "One Good Man" | Lewis Georgeson, Jane Hewland & Jesse O'Mahoney | March 12, 2006 |
Liam admits that he intended to hurt Asa on the football pitch against the wishes of his solicitor, which leaves an open door for Chelsea to sue both Liam and Harchester United. Lynda later discovers Chloe in Alex's bed when deciding to let Alex know about her true feelings whilst Liam tells Gavin that Chloe has walked out on him. Liam then makes a public statement that he never wanted to end Asa's career but wanted to get revenge for his tackle on Hector. The story begins to dominate the sporting world and Chloe has an uncomfortable appearance on a phone-in show where Lynda personally calls in to accuse her of having an affair with Alex and the next day, she announces the club will take legal proceedings against Chelsea, leading to a further four separate claims of prosecutions to be made. As Harchester prepare to face Tottenham, Liam - who is suspended from the match - receives a standing ovation when he emerges to take his seat in the stands, leaving him feeling humbled. Meanwhile, Eugene accepts the Australian FA's offer to represent the Socceroos at the World Cup, much to Casper's disappointment.
| 9.22 | "Two Wrongs" | Lewis Georgeson, Jane Hewland & Jesse O'Mahoney | March 19, 2006 |
Kick-off between Harchester and Tottenham is held up because of an unforeseen issue. Harchester's legal actions has exposed the revelation that players are not insured for intentional incidents that cause injury. With the players agents refusing to cover the costs, the match is abandoned and later every other match in the country is also called off for the same reason, landing Harchester in hot water with both the FA and UEFA threatening sanctions against them for bringing the game into disrepute. With Liam facing a potential life ban for football for his role in the scandal, Alex admits to Lynda that he started the chain reaction by going to the police in the first place. After Asa admits in an interview that he did indeed intend to injure Hector on the pitch, and UEFA later reach a deal that Liam can play on if the club drops their lawsuit on the condition that an inquiry is held at the end of the season. Meanwhile, Scarlett finally walks out on Eugene for good after admitting that she lied in court just to save him from going to prison whilst its also revealed that the Australian FA were not interested in having him play for the Socceroos and it was merely a stunt by the Australian film crew who brought Jessica back into his life. Final appearance of: Scarlett Rose
| 9.23 | "Il Postino" | Lewis Georgeson & Jesse O'Mahoney | March 26, 2006 |
The Premier League announce that the season will be extended by a week to allow for the postponed fixtures to be rescheduled, much to the FA's disapproval. The mystery owner writes another letter to Lynda, asking her to meet in the stands that evening on her own. She is greeted by a man named Mario Ruoppolo, who claims he wants rid of the club and proposes to sell it to the supporters association. Meanwhile, the players are on a camping trip to celebrate Gavin's stag weekend, where a surprise gift from Ryan leads to his one night fling with Cindi at the Christmas party being revealed. Later, as they prepare to head back home, a gunshot is heard and Ryan is distraught to find Gavin standing over his dead dog Jaws. On the day of Harchester's FA Cup sixth round match against Charlton Athletic, fans deposit their money for an ownership share of the club whilst tempers soon flare between Gavin and Ryan, eventually leading to the pair brawling in front of everyone and the referee is left with no choice but to send both of them off. In the boadroom, Amy discovers dozens of opened envelopes and it quickly dawns on her what has happened, Ruoppolo was in fact the alias of Lenny Clarke - who had recently been made redundant from the club's mailroom, and has taken out revenge by robbing the club out of £2.5 million.
| 9.24 | "The Blame Game" | Jane Hewland & Jesse O'Mahoney | April 2, 2006 |
Harchester cling on to force a replay in their FA Cup sixth round against Charlton. The police are called in to investigate the money that has been stolen by Lenny and Lynda is shocked to discover that DCI Burrows is leading the investigation. The chairman of supporters association soon realises that Mario Ruoppolo is a character in an Italian film called "Il Postino", and the fans are immediately furious to find that not only do they not own the club but that all of their deposits have been stolen. Casper suggests that the players should give up two weeks wages to help pay the fans back. Meanwhile, Ryan and Gavin continue not to see eye to eye with each other as the FA summons them both to a hearing for their on field bust-up.
