= Mike Bassett: England Manager =

2001 film by Steve Barron

- DVD cover
- Directed by: Steve Barron
- Written by: John R. Smith; Rob Sprackling
- Produced by: Steve Barron; Neil Peplow
- Starring: Ricky Tomlinson; Amanda Redman; Bradley Walsh; Dean Lennox Kelly; Geoff Bell
- Narrated by: Martin Bashir
- Cinematography: Mike Eley
- Edited by: Colin Green
- Music by: Antony Genn; Duncan Mackay; Mark Neary
- Production companies: Artists Independent Productions; Film Council; Hallmark Entertainment
- Distributed by: Entertainment Film Distributors
- Release date: 28 September 2001
- Running time: 89 minutes
- Country: United Kingdom
- Languages: English; Portuguese
- Box office: £3.6 million

Mike Bassett: England Manager is a 2001 British satirical mockumentary comedy film directed by Steve Barron and starring Ricky Tomlinson, Amanda Redman, Bradley Walsh, Dean Lennox Kelly and Geoff Bell. The film follows Mike Bassett, who is appointed manager of the England national football team having only previous experience of managing in the English lower leagues, he is tasked with guiding the team to qualification for the upcoming World Cup in Brazil. Journalist Martin Bashir provides voice-over, and the film features satirical cameo appearances from prominent figures in sport and entertainment such as Pelé, Ronaldo, Gabby Logan and Atomic Kitten. Minimal use of on-field action is employed, with the focus centred on behind-the-scenes events in boardrooms and the locker room.

The film initially received mixed reviews, but since its release has gained popularity as a cult film among English football fans. The film was followed by a television series, Mike Bassett: Manager in 2005. In 2014, there were plans to bring Mike Bassett back to the big screen in a movie titled Mike Bassett: Interim Manager. However, the kickstarter project that was essential for raising funds for the film did not meet its target.

== Plot ==
With the film narrated by Martin Bashir in a documentary form, we are told that Norwich City manager Mike Bassett (Ricky Tomlinson) is victorious in the Mr Clutch Cup final at Wembley Stadium. The Canaries later take part in an open-top bus parade but their driver accidentally takes a wrong turn and they end up going down a windswept motorway before returning to the city centre to finish the parade. Away from Norwich, it is reported in the papers that England manager Phil Cope has suffered a heart attack during qualification for the 2002 FIFA World Cup, which started out well but has since gone badly wrong.

Executives of the Football Association meet to decide who should be the new England manager. After phoning around Italy, France and Spain, they conclude that nobody wants the job and are forced to look for a new coach in England but cannot decide on who should take the role. The most successful Premier League manager is Scottish (referencing Sir Alex Ferguson), while the second-most successful is a former England captain who is interested in the job, but the FA decide that he is too much of a "loudmouth" and refuse to consider him. No other English manager in the Premier League is interested, forcing the FA to look into Division One for a new manager, with the press speculating that Mike Bassett may be the new man for the job. Mike lives at home with his wife Karine and son Jason. He is described as a former professional footballer with a journeyman career, playing for fourteen clubs including Doncaster Rovers, Plymouth Argyle, Hull City, Grimsby Town and Darlington.

When the press turn up at Mike's house to question him about the job, he initially denies the speculation until his son Jason appears with a phone to tell him he got the job. Bassett takes over the England team and moves to appoint his coaching staff, namely assistant manager turned car salesman Lonnie Urquart (Philip Jackson) who is not interested unless Mike buys a car from him (later revealed to be a Daewoo Nexia), and coach Dave Dodds (Bradley Walsh), a sycophantic yes man who once managed with Mike at Colchester United (a reference to Phil Neal under Graham Taylor). The team need one win from three World Cup qualifiers to get to the World Cup finals in Brazil. Bassett heads towards Sunderland to meet Kevin Tonkinson (Dean Lennox Kelly), a long-retired playmaker that he believes can win England the World Cup, but upon arrival at the pub, he finds Tonkinson laying drunk on a pool table with people pouring beer into his mouth. Once calmed down, Bassett tells him to clean up his act and if he can promise to do it, then he will recall him to the squad.

Bassett takes his first training session at Bisham Abbey ahead of his first game at Wembley against Poland. He selects a traditional 4–4–2 formation and writes his team sheets on the back of an old cigarette packet. During the game, Tonkinson opens the scoring with a dink shot over the opposing goalkeeper, but Poland soon put more pressure and eventually equalise before going on to win the game 2–1. Bassett is criticised by the media for his formation and tactics used, while, some England players anonymously state to an interviewer that they have doubts about Bassett's credibility to lead the team. Bassett sits his coaching staff down to review the game but Doddsy's wife has taped Ground Force over the recording. In an attempt to improve the team's mental and psychological wellbeing, they visit a sports science institute but half the team are injured in the process, leaving Bassett with selection issues over his next game against Belgium. In a mix-up, his secretary accidentally calls up to the squad two aging Third Division players called Ron Benson and Tony Hedges. When querying who they are, Mike realises she has mistaken the brand of cigarettes Benson & Hedges as the names of players. Bassett is mocked in a press conference but claims he called them up intentionally. England lose the game 3–0, leading to pressure being placed on his family by angry supporters.

For the last qualification game, England need to beat Slovenia in order to qualify and with Tonkinson missing due to a drunken car crash, they struggle to a 0–0 draw in which captain Gary Wackett (Geoff Bell) is sent off and Rufus Smalls (Robbie Gee) misses a penalty. After the game, they learn that Luxembourg have beaten Turkey 2–0, which sees them go through on goal difference. The team head off to record the official England World Cup song with girl group Atomic Kitten and "hellraiser" Keith Allen.

England travel to Brazil for the finals but on arriving at the airport they start brawling with the Scottish and Irish teams. A difficult group stage sees them on the verge of heading home after they can only manage a goalless draw with unfancied Egypt before losing 4–0 to Mexico. To make matters worse, Bassett receives a phone call from Karine at home in England informing him that Jason was bullied at school for the Egypt draw, resulting in his eyebrows being shaved off. A training session is ruined after Urquart locks the footballs in the team's Chevrolet Kadett and goes shopping. Wackett is then sent home for taking part in hooliganism and Tonkinson accidentally gets involved in a drunken tryst with a trans woman and is also booted from the team. During a team meeting the next morning, Urquart begins to praise the Mexicans by getting the English players to cheer "three cheers for Ramirez"; this angers Mike, who proclaims "We're England", saying that the country hates him and that his wife is about to leave him. Urquart, unhappy with Mike's tone, asks him to get more off his chest, which leads to Mike calling him a "small-minded bigot" and criticising the car he bought from him. Urquart reacts by punching him in the nose and is effectively sacked from the team instantly. Later that night, Tonkinson reconciles with Bassett. The two share a drink and then dance drunkenly on a bar top. When Lightfoot gets to the bar and calms Bassett down, the pair both fall off in full view of the local press.

The morning after his drunken incident, Bassett is involved in a press conference at which he is expected to step down from the managerial position. When he announces that he is carrying on, the press begin to get hostile and Bassett responds by reciting "If—" by Rudyard Kipling, which he finishes by saying that "England will be playing 4–4–fucking–2" and storms out. Following this, England need to beat Argentina to get through to the second round. Reporter Tommo Thompson (Phill Jupitus) proclaims that if England win, he will quit his job and become a bin man. In a close game in which England are the better team, they eventually succeed when Tonkinson dribbles past the Argentinian defence and blasts a shot that deflects off the crossbar. Tonkinson then punches the ball into the net – a reference to the "hand of God" from Argentina's Diego Maradona which helped knock England out of the 1986 World Cup. As the full-time whistle sounds and the England team celebrate with Tonkinson stripping completely naked, Bassett heads down the tunnel telling Doddsy he is going to call his wife.

It is later seen in a series of newspaper articles that England advanced to the knockout stages, where Smalls ended his goal drought by scoring a hat-trick against Romania and two more goals against France. They eventually lost to host nation Brazil in the semi-finals. Tommo is also seen briefly working as a bin man following his statement during the final press conference. On their plane journey back to Britain, Bashir says to Bassett that England had equalled their best performance since they won in 1966 (in 1990, England finished fourth). Bassett replies that he is ready to move aside and let somebody else take the job. As the plane doors open at the airport, the team depart to a cheering crowd, where a surprised but happy Bassett confirms to the waiting press that he will remain as manager.

== Cast ==
=== Main cast ===
- Ricky Tomlinson as Mike Bassett, a former player turned manager from the lower leagues who leads Norwich City to the Mr. Clutch Cup. He then becomes manager of England but is derided by the fans and English media for not being good enough for the role.
- Amanda Redman as Karine Bassett, Mike's wife whose patience and loyalty is put to the test when her husband's popularity plummets during England's poor run of form.
- Bradley Walsh as Dave 'Doddsy' Dodds, Bassett's first team coach who agrees with everyone else's opinions, echoing instructions and very rarely offering any of his own thoughts.
- Philip Jackson as Lonnie Urquart, Bassett's assistant manager and used car salesman (a reference to Lawrie McMenemy under the Graham Taylor era) who is very old-fashioned in his beliefs and often compares England players' performances to cars. He is opinionated but is more concerned with getting the players to buy cars from him.
- Martin Bashir narrates the entire film and also appears in scenes as the interviewer who is given complete access to the England setup as part of the documentary. He offers an impartial view of the events that unfold.
- Geoffrey Hutchings as Geoffrey Lightfoot, chairman of the Football Association who pays very little interest in Mike or his role.
- Phill Jupitus as Tommo Thompson, a news reporter who is very sceptical about Mike but after making a bet with him is seen to quit his job and become a bin man when England beat Argentina.
- Danny Tennant as Jason Bassett, Mike's son and a youth team player at Norwich City. He is later targeted by bullies when pressure mounts on his father after England drew with Egypt.

=== Footballers ===
- Dean Lennox Kelly as Kevin 'Tonka' Tonkinson (#10), an alcoholic Geordie playmaker, once considered England's most gifted, who Mike brought out of retirement. He is based on Paul Gascoigne.
- Robbie Gee as Rufus 'Smallsy' Smalls (#9), a misfortunate striker of Trinidadian origin from Newcastle United who had endured an international goal drought between a 2000 penalty miss against Portugal and the World Cup. Mike dubs him "a real-life Roy of the Rovers".
- Geoff Bell as Gary 'Wacko' Wackett (#5), England captain and a hard-tackling, intimidating central defender from Leicester City who is often sent off. During the World Cup, he was arrested for rioting, allowing Alan Massey to stand in for him as captain. He is based on Steve Walsh and Terry Butcher.
- Terry Kiely as Steve 'Harpsey' Harper (#7), a right-sided midfielder from Manchester United who claims to not care about his lifestyle but owns many sports cars and constantly talks on the phone to his model girlfriend, even during training. He is based on David Beckham.
- Chris Boyle-McQuarry as Alan Massey (#11), a young and timid though secretly talented winger, also from Manchester United, who later becomes England captain in Wackett's absence.
- Dean Holness as Danny (#15) and John Alford as Deano (#16), midfielders who are part of a double act.

Other England players are Scott Mean as Parkesy (#4), Julian Ballantine as Robbo (#8), Toby Redwood as Berksy (#1), Thomas Kenyon as Macca (#6), Robert Campion as Smudger, Peter McGillycuddy as Gorgeous (#13), Andy Ansah as Super, Alex Lawler as Sexy (#12), Phil Gridelet as Grids (#18), Dion Osbourne as Ossie, Danny Husbands as Normal, Declan Perkins as Perks (#23), Kim Durham as Ron Benson (#27) and Robert Hudson as Tony Hedges (#28). Des Hamilton, Paul Rattray and Neil Peplow appears as Scottish footballers, with Glenn Mulhern as an Irish player.

=== Other cast ===
- Malcolm Terris as preceding England manager Phil Cope
- Ulrich Thomsen as Dr Hans Shoegaarten
- Lloyd McGuire as Midlands Representative
- Stephen Walters as England Supporter
- Sean Gilder as Independent Journalist
- Iain Rogerson as Ticket Collector

=== Cameos ===
- Pelé as himself, he arrives at a hotel whilst doing a television interview and is confronted by a drunk Mike who is dancing on the bar.
- Ronaldo as himself, he is asked by a Brazilian television presenter for what he thinks about Mike Bassett.
- Atomic Kitten as themselves, they sing the England World Cup song with Keith Allen and the team.
- Keith Allen as himself, he produces and sings the World Cup song with the team.
- Sue Barker as herself, presenter of BBC's A Question of Sport, to which Rufus is a team captain.
- Gabby Logan as herself, a television presenter who presents the World Cup TV show.
- Barry Venison as himself, an ex-footballer and football pundit who appears on the World Cup TV show and interviews Mike over a poor satellite video link.
- Alan Green, Brian Moore, Clive Tyldesley and Martin Tyler are commentators on England games.
- Natasha Kaplinsky as herself, a Sky News reporter.
- Dickie Bird as himself, a guest on BBC's A Question of Sport.
- Richard Guest as himself, a guest on BBC's A Question of Sport.
- Vincent Marzello as himself, a US Newsreader.
- Kevin Piper as himself, the Norwich newsreader.

== England under Mike Bassett ==
Fixture	Result | Date
Poland (Home – WCQ8 – Group 3)	Lost 2–1 | 12 April 2001
Belgium (Away – WCQ9 – Group 3)	Lost 3–0 | 20 September 2001
Slovenia (Home – WCQ10 – Group 3)	Drew 0–0 | 18 November 2001
Egypt (Neutral – World Cup R1 – Group F)	Drew 0–0 | 15 June 2002
Mexico (Neutral – World Cup R1 – Group F)	Lost 4–0 | 19 June 2002
Argentina (Neutral – World Cup R1 – Group F)	Won 1–0 | 7 July 2002
Romania (Neutral – World Cup – Last 16)	Won 3–0 | 12 July 2002
France (Neutral – World Cup – Quarter Finals)	Won 2–0 | 16 July 2002
Brazil (Neutral – World Cup – Semi Finals)	Lost 1–0 | 21 July 2002
unknown (Neutral – World Cup – Third Place Play-offs)	Lost | July 2002

== Production ==
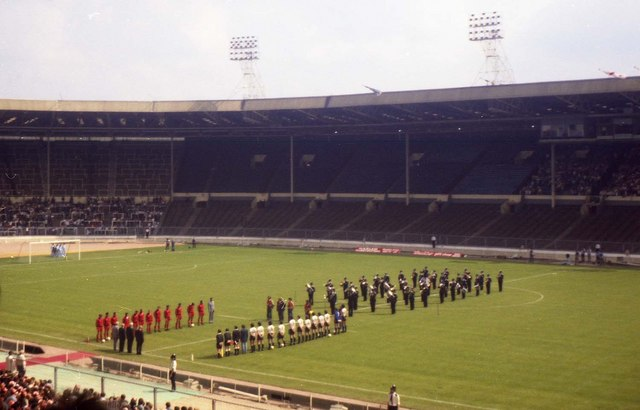
Wembley Stadium was used for England's home games.

Mike Bassett: England Manager is based on the career of Graham Taylor, and documentary An Impossible Job. Shot in high definition, the film is made to look like it had been shot on 35mm.

The film was shot entirely in the United Kingdom and Brazil. English football locations prominently used in the movie were the former Wembley Stadium, the Football Association headquarters at Lancaster Gate and the Bisham Abbey training complex. Two stadiums in Rio de Janeiro were also utilised: São Januário, home of history-rich Brazilian club Vasco da Gama, was used for the games against Egypt and Mexico, while Maracanã was used for the game against Argentina.

== After the film's events ==
In the follow-up television series, Mike Bassett: Manager, it is revealed that Bassett was sacked by England after failing to qualify for the 2004 European Championships, including a defeat to Liechtenstein. Bassett subsequently guided Newcastle United to two consecutive relegations, before unsuccessful returns to Norwich and Colchester lead to him taking over at his father's former club, Wirral County.

== Alternative ending ==
An alternative ending was shot for the film, in which Mike rejects a four-year extension to stay on as manager with England choosing to appoint a foreign manager as his replacement. Gary Wackett has now retired and is now on television as a Gladiator, whilst Rufus Smalls is given his captaincy back on BBC's A Question of Sport. Kevin Tonkinson has also retired and now is the manager of his local pub whereas Mike is seen coaching players on a sandy field and is now the new manager of Bolivia. The film ends with Mike jumping on board a red jeep and driving off with Karine and Jason.

== Sequel ==
Following the success of the film, numerous talks over the years about a possible sequel. In late 2004, it announced that Mike Bassett 2 was in the works, with the story being continued on from the first movie, which sees this time Bassett leading his country to the European Championships in Portugal in 2004. This project was later abandoned and instead the producers reverted to the idea of a television series for ITV Mike Bassett: Manager.

In 2016, a Kickstarter campaign was started, which saw both Ricky Tomlinson and Bradley Walsh reprise their roles for a promotional trailer, asking fans to fund to a sequel called Mike Bassett: Interim Manager. The movie needed to hit a certain financial target by a specific date in order for it to be made. The campaign did not hit its target and the project was shelved. It was understood the script centred round Bassett coming out of retirement in order to help assist the current England manager, who is German and struggling to engage his players. Before too long Bassett finds himself back in the hotseat and possibly leading his country to another World Cup.

== Reception ==
The movie received a mixed reception from critics. When the film was released in the United Kingdom, it originally opened at number 3, behind Artificial Intelligence: AI and Moulin Rouge! in the top two spots.

Since its release, Mike Bassett: England Manager has gained popularity as a cult film among English football fans. Rugby coach Brendan Venter gave a press interview in 2010 that parodied one given by "Doddsie" in the film, in which he simply agrees with everything the questioner says, even if that contradicts previous answers.

Sprackling observed in 2018 that "when the film actually came out in 2001, Sven-Göran Eriksson was in charge and he was at the height of his pomp. Everyone had become convinced that it had all changed now, that we were going to be successful and continental about it all. This bungling uselessness was all in the past. Everything felt like it was going to be all modern and new and professional. The wheels weren't going to come off and we weren't going to have disasters. But that wasn't the case. That's why people come back to [the film] so often, because the same disasters continue to happen."

Stephen Glynn's 2018 book The British Football Film discusses the film at length, noting that it "does not always undercut a nostalgic and populist imperialism."

== Comparison to real events ==
Some of the events in the actual 2002 FIFA World Cup hold similarities to the film. Although the tournament was hosted by Japan and South Korea instead of Brazil, England, like in the movie, drew their opening game with a drab performance but this time with Sweden and then went on to beat Argentina 1–0. Although there was no revenge or similarity for the 1986 "hand of God" incident, the penalty scored by David Beckham was seen as redemption following his criticised sending-off four years earlier at the immediate previous World Cup edition following a clash with Argentine midfielder Diego Simeone. Just like in the film, England were knocked out by eventual champions Brazil, only that in the film they lost in the semi-finals as opposed to the quarter-finals.

It was also recalled in 2019, when, in an echo of Bassett's disastrous open-top bus parade at the beginning of the film, Norwich's open-top bus broke down as they celebrated winning the EFL Championship.

== See also ==
- List of association football films
