= Terry Kiely =

English actor

Terry Kiely (born September 1975 in Britwell) is an English actor. He played the character Karl Fletcher in the Sky One series Dream Team for eight years.

== Acting career ==
Kiely quit Dream Team three times but returned each time after struggling to find alternative roles. The character was eventually killed off at Kiely's request in 2005, but returned in the final series to act as a spirit guide to Harchester United player Jason Porter. Fletcher appeared to him as his guide, after Porter took part in a ouija board event.

He has also appeared in Mike Bassett: England Manager playing the character Harpsey, a womaniser constantly on his mobile phone (much to the annoyance of his manager), and Family Affairs, where he briefly played the character PC Dan Ellison.

Kiely took on the role of Nolan in a small film focussing on football hooligans known as It's a Casual Life, released in 2003. He also appeared as Paul in Rough Justice, a little-known Hewland International/ITV show.

== Personal life ==
Friend and fellow actor Gerard Kelly, who died in 2010 left his entire estate to Kiely. At this time, Kiely was working as a swimming pool lifeguard in Surrey.

In March 2023, Kiely stated he quit acting after falling out of love with the profession and was now working as a host at a private members club in Soho.
