= University of Roehampton =

Public university in London, England

Coordinates: 51.4566°N 0.2431°W

- Type: Public research university
- Established: 2004 – Roehampton University; 1975 – Roehampton Institute of Higher Education; 1841 – establishment of Whitelands College
- Affiliations: The Cathedrals Group; European University Association; Universities UK
- Budget: £132.1 million (2021/2022)
- Chancellor: Sandip Verma, Baroness Verma
- Vice-Chancellor: Jean-Noël Ezingeard
- Students: 11,945 (2024/25)
- Undergraduates: 7,085 (2024/25)
- Postgraduates: 4,865 (2024/25)
- Location: London, UK
- Website: roehampton.ac.uk

The University of Roehampton is a public research university in Roehampton, London. Founded as the Roehampton Institute of Higher Education, the university was established by four institutions, founded in the 19th century, which today make up the university's constituent colleges: Digby Stuart College, Froebel College, Southlands College and Whitelands College.

Between 2000 and 2004, Roehampton, together with the University of Surrey, partnered as the Federal University of Surrey. In 2004, Roehampton became an independent university, and in 2011, it was renamed the University of Roehampton. The university is one of the post-1992 universities and is a member of the European University Association and Universities UK.

The university achieved a silver rating in the 2023 Teaching Excellence Framework and it also received positive results in recent student satisfaction surveys and national research assessments.

== History ==
Flag of the University of Roehampton, with a quarter to represent each of the University's four constituent colleges.

Roehampton still operates through a collegiate system comprising four historic colleges, each originally established in the 19th century as women's teacher training colleges:

- Whitelands College – Founded in 1841 by the Church of England, the college was one of the first teacher training schools for women in the UK. It occupies a 14-acre site overlooking Richmond Park.
- Southlands College – Established by the Methodist Church in 1872, originally in Battersea, as a teacher training college for women, becoming coeducational in 1965. Today it is the location of the university's business school.
- Digby Stuart College – Established in 1874 as a teacher training college for Roman Catholic women. The college owes its existence to the Society of the Sacred Heart, whose members continue to support the college and the university.
- Froebel College – Founded in 1892, the secular college was established to further the values of Friedrich Fröbel, the German educationalist who pioneered a holistic view of child development.

All four colleges were founded to address the need to educate poor and disadvantaged children. In 1976, the four colleges joined to form the Roehampton Institute of Higher Education. Its first rector was Kevin Keohane, the former professor of science education at Chelsea College of Science and Technology.

The institution gained research degree awarding powers in 1998 and in 2000 became part of the Federal University of Surrey as the University of Surrey Roehampton. In 2004 it became a university in its own right as Roehampton University. It was one of the last institutions to gain university status under the pre-Higher Education Act 2004 rules that required research degree awarding powers.

Since 2011, the university has been branded the University of Roehampton. However, its legal name remains Roehampton University. In 2012, Whitelands College was legally merged with the university, bringing all the colleges into a common management structure.

== Organisation ==
Academic departments

- Faculty of Business and Law (including Roehampton University Business School and Roehampton University Law School)
- School of Arts (including Computing)
- School of Education (rated as an outstanding provider by OFSTED)
- School of Humanities and Social Sciences
- School of Life and Health Sciences (including Nursing)
- School of Psychology
- Sustainable Engineering and Technology Education Centre
- Croydon University College - In 2020 the University of Roehampton announced a partnership with Croydon College (Croydon University Centre). The Centre delivers Nursing programmes and a range of undergraduate programmes in Croydon town centre.

== Academic profile ==
=== Research ===
Roehampton's research spans five key areas: Creative exchange, Health and wellbeing, Social justice and inclusivity, Faith in society, and Economic Sustainability and Environmental Conservation. Roehampton supports several research centres across its academic disciplines:

1. Centre for Practical Philosophy, Theology and Religion: Engaging in research emphasising the significance of Philosophy, Theology, and Religion in modern societies, this centre explores the intersections of faith, religious practice, and race.
2. Centre for Research in Psychological Wellbeing: Works to improve our understanding of factors that influence health, mental health, and wellbeing. The Centre for Research in Psychological Wellbeing focuses on applied research in counselling and psychotherapy.
3. Centre for Integrated Research in Life and Health Sciences: Promoting factors supporting healthy living, this centre tackles health inequalities through an interdisciplinary approach. It integrates life and health sciences to address critical health challenges, aiming to enhance quality of life. The centre receives funding from the National Institute for Health Research (NIHR) and the Medical Research Council (MRC).
4. Centre for Equality, Justice and Social Change: Explores and promotes social justice in relation to inequalities, prejudice, and social trends in diverse societies.
5. Centre for Research in Arts and Creative Exchange: Emphasising the value of creativity and the arts for social and political change, this centre provides a space for collaborative inquiry and practice.
6. Research Centre for Literature and Inclusion: Focuses on equitable cultural representation, access, and inclusion, working with communities and organisations across various sectors.
7. Research Centre in History and Classics: Uses insights from the past to inform public understanding and address present societal challenges.
8. Centre for Sustainability and Responsible Management: focuses on interdisciplinary approaches to sustainability and Corporate Social Responsibility (CSR). It aims to develop sustainable and ethical practices in organisations and enterprises, addressing contemporary challenges like climate change and societal equity
9. Centre for Learning, Teaching and Human Development: Enhances educational outcomes for effective lifelong learning, leading to creative, inclusive, and healthier societies.

=== Reputation and rankings ===
Rankings
National rankings
- Complete (2027): 123
- Guardian (2027): 120
- Times / Sunday Times (2027): 124=

Global rankings
- QS (2027): 1001–1200
- THE (2026): 801–1000

The university was recognised for research in the REF 2021, for which 218 staff were submitted in 12 areas and were graded 3*-4* overall. Overall 77% of the research submitted was ranked as 'world leading' or 'internationally excellent', an increase of 11% since REF2014. In the Times Higher Education Young University Rankings (2024), Roehampton was ranked 164 of 1,172.

In the 2014 Research Excellence Framework (REF), the university was already ranked as the most research-intensive post-1992 university in the UK. Roehampton submitted work by more than two-thirds of its academic staff, in 13 subject areas. This is the highest proportion of any post-1992 university. Dance was the top performing subject, with 94% of research rated 4* and 3* – making it the highest-rated department in its subject area in the UK. Roehampton was also ranked 3rd in London for research quality in Education, and 4th for English. Roehampton was ranked highly in London in these subject areas. Overall, 66 per cent Roehampton's research was judged either world-leading or internationally excellent.

In the 2008 Research Assessment Exercise (RAE), Roehampton University was ranked first in the country for Dance and Biological Anthropology. Ten out of the fifteen subjects that submitted work included at least some proportion of research judged to be world-leading in terms of its originality and significance. 78% of all research undertaken at the university was of an international standard.

Roehampton is ranked 38th in the UK for the impact of its research. The University works with local businesses, arts organisations, the third sector, and higher education across the UK and internationally.

== Facilities ==
=== Library ===
The university opened a new library in 2017, designed by Feilden Clegg Bradley Studios. The library houses the Jewish Resource Centre Collection, the Centre for Marian Studies, a collection of resources covering all matters regarding the Virgin Mary, the Queen's Archive, featuring material on authority and governance within the Roman Catholic Church in the UK and the Richmal Crompton Collection of books and archive material accumulated during the lifetime of the author Richmal Crompton (1890–1969).

=== Biomechanics research facilities ===
The university has a biomechanics laboratory, which is based at Whitelands College. The lab is equipped with advanced optical motion analysis systems, Kistler force plates, Biometrics Electromyography equipment, Goniometers and 3D Accelerometers, Motion Tracking Sensors, and Physiological assessment equipment.

=== E-sports ===
The university has an e-sports arena, with 20 PCs and facilities for live streaming and video editing. The University of Roehampton was the first university in the UK to offer e-sports scholarships.

=== Mary Seacole Health Innovation Centre ===
The Centre was unveiled in a ceremony on 28 September by Sir David Warren, the Chair of the Nursing and Midwifery Council. It cost £3.2m to construct and was made possible by a capital grant from the Office for Students (OfS) to support the development of a new Healthcare Hub. The Centre has been supported by several external partners, including Croydon Health Services, Epsom and St Helier University Hospitals, St George's University Hospitals, Kingston Hospital, Sutton Health and Care, Your Healthcare, Central London Community Health, Southwest London and St George's Mental Health, Surrey and Borders Partnership and CCGs. The Centre is named after Mary Seacole, a British-Jamaican nurse known for her role in supporting British soldiers during the Crimean War. The facility bears a mural, painted by Alban Low, which portrays her likeness alongside images of her caring for British soldiers and the medals she received for doing so.

=== Accommodation ===
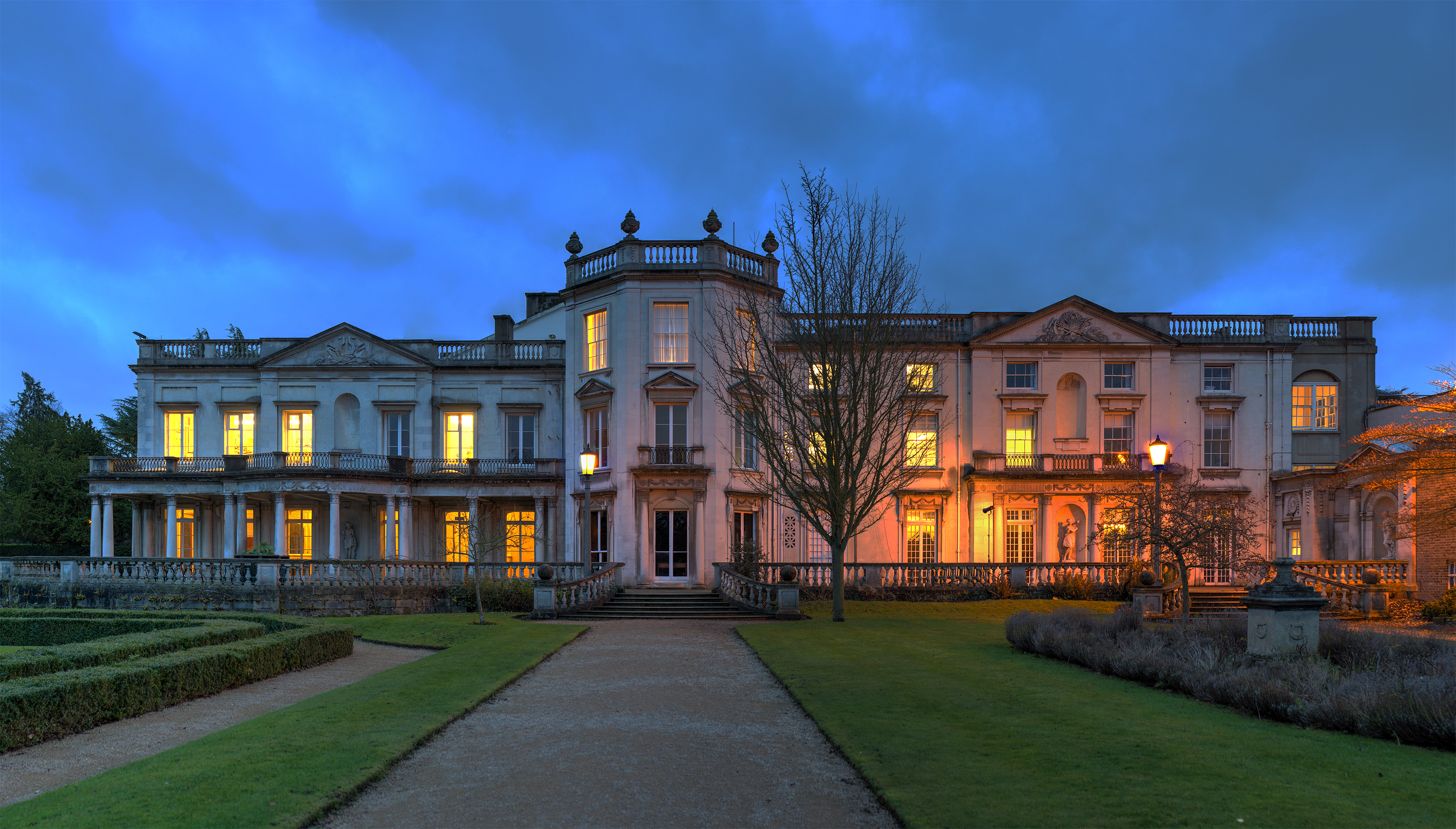
Grove House is Grade II* listed. It is part of Froebel College.

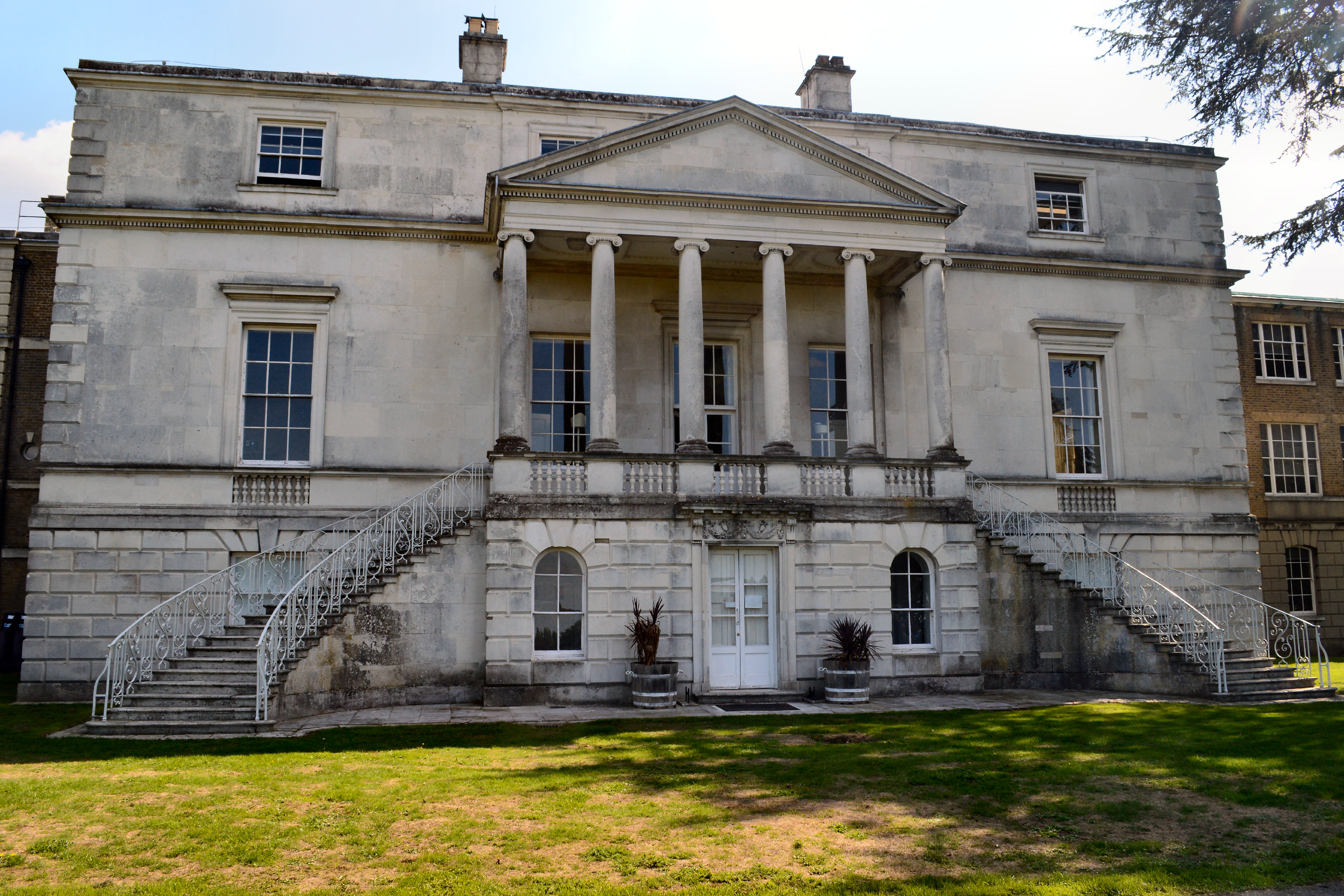
Parkstead House was built in the 1760s. Now Whitelands College, it is the oldest of the four constituent colleges of Roehampton.

Digby Stuart College

- Bede House
- Elm Grove Hall
- Lee House
- Newman House
- Shaw House

Froebel College

- Aspen House
- Chadwick Hall - Shortlisted for the Stirling Prize for excellence in architecture in 2018.
- Garden Court
- Lawrence
- Linden House
- Mount Clare
- New Court
- Old Court
- Willow House
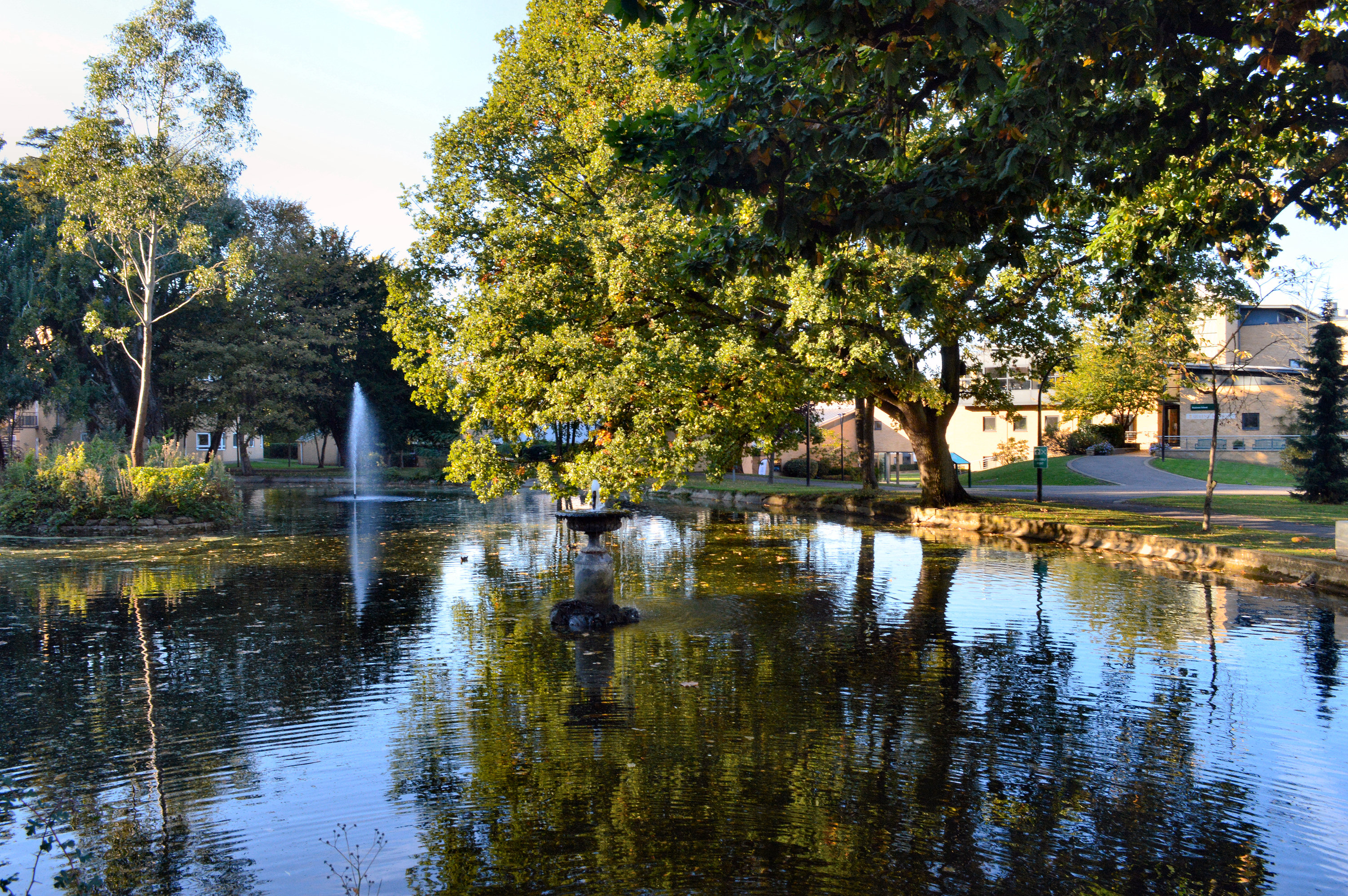
  The Southlands Lake around the area of Southlands College.

Southlands College

- Aldersgate and Epworth Court
- Wesley Hall

Whitelands College

- Beverley and Cheltenham
- Durham and Gilesgate
- Kings and Melrose
- Sutherland and Walpole

== Student life ==
=== Roehampton Students' Union (RSU) ===
The RSU is the main organisation of student representation at the university. It is led by student officers elected by the student body and aims to promote the interests and welfare of all those studying at Roehampton. It also organises events and represents students at the university level. The RSU also organises nights out in London, some of these consist of the Clapham grand once a month, fez club Putney on Wednesday nights and the union's special event the Bop hosted at the union bar. The Union itself has 12 different bars, cafes and restaurants spread around the campus.

In September 2013 Roehampton Students' Union was awarded £226,900 from NUS Students' Green Fund for a sustainability initiative with a focus on urban food growing. The project is now called Growhampton. Growhampton runs a cafe, the Hive, alongside a regular market day, where food produced by students and small local organisations is sold. Growhampton is a sustainability project focused on food education and urban agriculture. It has received support from local councils and student-led funding initiatives.

The Union runs Fresh Network for student media.

=== Third Row Dance Company ===
The Third Row Dance Company is a company for undergraduate dance students, led by students. Founded in 2008, the company is made up of dancers selected through an audition process. It commissions professional choreographers to create works, in order for the dancers to gain experience of the professional dance world, which are performed to other students both within the university and outside. Guest choreographers have included Australian dancer and choreographer Daniel Riley, formerly of Bangarra Dance Theatre and since late 2021 artistic director of the Australian Dance Theatre.

== People associated with Roehampton University ==
=== Notable alumni ===
Amongst the alumni of the University of Roehampton, and other institutions that fall under that banner are:

- Niki and Sammy Albon, YouTubers
- Toby Anstis, radio DJ
- Mike Bailey, actor
- Lyn Brown, politician
- Jack Garratt, singer
- Jon Gilbert, bibliographer
- Jon Goodman, footballer
- Matt Henry, actor and singer
- Rachel John, actress and singer
- Allyson Jule, professor/author
- Daniel Kitson, comedian
- Samira Makhmalbaf, filmmaker
- Helen Metcalf, educator/politician
- Alize Mounter, former Miss England
- Beverly Naya, actress
- Brody Neuenschwander, artist and calligrapher
- Danielle Perez, former Miss Gibraltar
- Rita Ramnani, actress and dancer
- Chris Robshaw, Harlequins and England rugby captain
- David Rossdale, Bishop of Grimsby
- Djoumin Sangaré, footballer
- Darren Shan, author
- Joe Tillen, footballer
- Deepak Tripathi, historian
- Lamorna Watts, actress
- Sarah Hall-Adams, Founder of SarahNade Performances
- Tim Woolcock, painter

=== Chancellors and vice-chancellors ===
Sandip Verma, Baroness Verma was appointed the Chancellor in 2022., after Jacqueline Wilson retired from the role in 2020.

Dame Jacqueline Wilson was appointed Chancellor of the university in August 2014, she succeeded the first Chancellor John Simpson (2004–2014).

The Vice-Chancellor of the university is Jean-Noël Ezingeard, who succeeded Paul O'Prey in May 2019. Former Vice-Chancellor O'Prey was appointed Commander of the Order of the British Empire (CBE) in the Queen's 90th Birthday Honours list for his services to higher education and the literary history of the First World War.

== See also ==
- Armorial of UK universities
- College of Education
- List of universities in the UK
