= Lamorna Watts =

- Born: 11 November; Bristol, England
- Occupation: Actress
- Years active: 2004–present

Lamorna Watts is an English actress, who played Jenny Blackman in the British soap Hollyoaks: Let Loose and Holly Jones in the Sky1 drama Dream Team.

== Background ==
Lamorna Watts began a love for the stage at an early age and attended a variety of dancing, singing and acting classes in Bristol and performed in numerous plays throughout her younger years. Her first professional paid theatrical production was as a member of the children's choir in Andrew Lloyd Webber’s musical Joseph and the Amazing Technicolor Dreamcoat at The Bristol Hippodrome.

At the age of 14, Watts was signed to Select Model Management and was shot for numerous magazines such as 19, Mizz, Bliss, Shout, Sugar, and The Face.

Whilst studying a BA Honours English Literature degree at the Roehampton University of Surrey, Watts continued modelling fronting numerous global hair brands such as L’Oreal, Aveda and Nicky Clarke as well as performing in a TV Commercial and music videos.

On completion of her degree in 2003 Watts pursued a professional acting career where she worked in various regular TV dramas and commercials.

== Early training ==
Watts grew up in Bristol where she started her career early – at 14, she was picked out, from thousands of girls across the United Kingdom, as the face of 1995. She was immediately signed by Select, the model agency that launched the career of Helena Christensen, after being spotted in two model competitions.

Her first TV role was on the popular UK TV show Dream Team, which was shown on Sky1 in the UK.

== Career ==
Watts launched her acting career in Dream Team, where she appeared in 23 episodes as Holly Jones. Dream Team is a British television series produced by Hewland International which aired on Sky1 and Sky3 from 1997 to 2007, that chronicled the on-field and off-field affairs of the fictional soccer team Harchester United F.C.

She has also played a lead and a supporting role in two upcoming British films, Fallen Angels and Zemanovaload. as well as roles in pop videos for Busted and Delta Goodrem.

Watts went on two further TV series including the BBC1 daytime soap opera Doctors.

Watts is known for her role in Hollyoaks: Let Loose, where she played the leading role of Jenny Blackman opposite Marcus Patric and Gemma Atkinson. The show was initially broadcast on E4, which is the sister channel of C4. The show was spin-off of the award-winning C4 show Hollyoaks, which was originally devised by Phil Redmond. The actress appeared in all 13 episodes of the series.
