= Ricky Whittle =

English actor (born 1979)

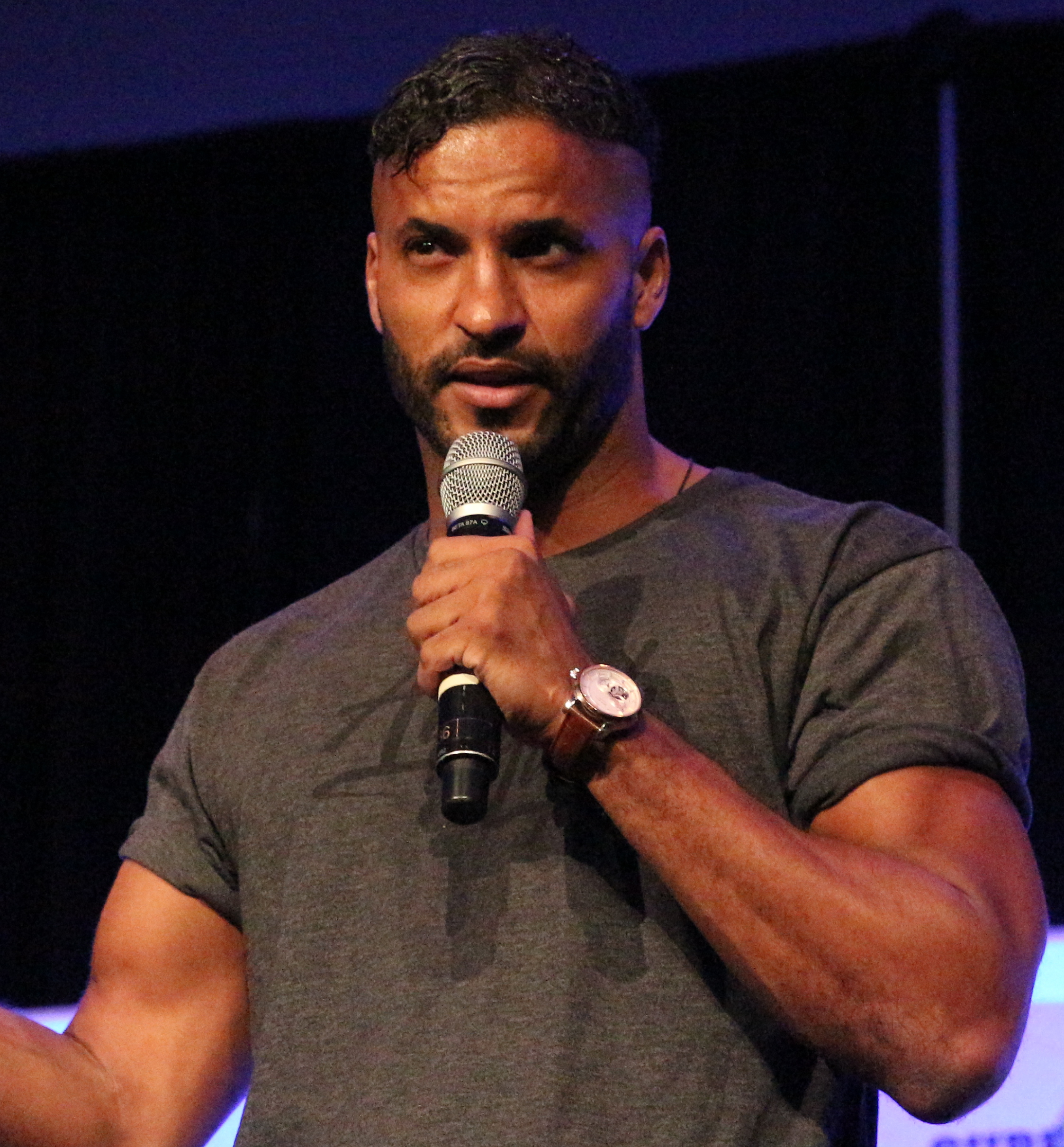
- Whittle in 2017
- Born: 31 December 1979 (age 46); Oldham, Greater Manchester, England
- Education: Southampton Solent University
- Occupation: Actor
- Years active: 2002–present
- Agent: Gersh
- Known for: Hollyoaks; Single Ladies; Mistresses; The 100; American Gods; Dream Team
- Website: www.rickywhittle.com

Richard George Whittle (born 31 December 1979) is a British actor. Whittle first came to prominence as a model for Reebok in the early 2000s. He is known in the United Kingdom for his role as Calvin Valentine in the soap opera Hollyoaks. In 2009, he finished second in the BBC reality competition Strictly Come Dancing. In 2012, Whittle crossed over to American television when he booked a recurring role on VH-1's Single Ladies, followed by a recurring role on ABC's Mistresses in 2014. From 2014 to 2016, Whittle appeared in The CW's post-apocalyptic drama The 100 as Lincoln. Whittle starred in the Starz television series American Gods for three seasons.

== Early life and education ==
Richard George Whittle was born on 31 December 1979 in Oldham, England, to Harry and Maggie (Goodwin) Whittle. He is the oldest of three children. His mother is from England and his father is from Jamaica. His father was in the Royal Air Force so the family moved to a different country every few years. However, Whittle was primarily raised in Northern Ireland and revealed that he had been bullied as a child because he was the only black child in school. At one point, Whittle told his mother he wanted to be white so he could fit in. Whittle studied law at Southampton Solent University where he was football team captain. In order to pay for text books, he started to model. However, Whittle left university just before graduation.

== Career ==
=== 2002–2011: Career beginnings and Hollyoaks ===
Whittle took up modelling in college. He would go on to become the face of Reebok in 2000. Whittle made his acting debut in 2002 the television series Dream Team which aired on Sky 1. The actor said the show was a "dream job" for a young actor just starting out. Whittle's agent surprised him and sent him to audition for Dream Team. Whittle credits his career to his co-star Terence Maynard whom he auditioned with. Whittle left the show in 2006 after series 9 and in May 2006, it was announced that Whittle had joined the cast of the Channel 4 soap opera Hollyoaks in the role of Calvin Valentine. In December 2009, it was announced that Whittle would leave Hollyoaks and the character would be killed off in 2010. In an interview with Digital Spy he explained his reasons for leaving Hollyoaks and revealed his plans to try his hand at American television and film. He only planned to do four years with the series. In the summer of 2009, Whittle joined series 7 of the BBC reality series, Strictly Come Dancing. He was paired with professional dancer Natalie Lowe. Whittle would place second after sports presenter Chris Hollins. He permanently relocated to Los Angeles in the summer of 2011 to further his career.

=== 2012–2016: American TV breakthrough and The 100 ===
Upon his arrival in the US, Whittle met with someone to put a reel together. The meeting led to him signing with manager Ken Jacobsen. Jacobsen has also represented James Franco, Michelle Williams and Hilary Swank. Not long after, Whittle was cast in the feature film Austenland opposite Keri Russell, Jane Seymour and Jennifer Coolidge. Whittle joked that he only booked the role because of his body as the audition tape he submitted cut off his head. He found it ironic that it filmed on location in the UK when he travelled to Los Angeles to pursue American TV projects. After that, Whittle had no problem booking gigs. However, his immigration status caused him to pull out of a few projects. Whittle was set to film an episode of the NBC sitcom Up All Night when his management contacted him the night before to inform him that the network would not accept his visa. After this incident, Whittle decided to apply for his green card.

In March 2012, it was announced that Whittle was cast in the recurring role of Charles, a love interest of Denise Vasi's character, in the second season of the VH1 comedic-drama Single Ladies. Whittle submitted his audition tape just as he returned to the UK for Christmas. While he was too young for the role he initially auditioned for, the producers found another role for him. Whittle was initially supposed to appear in two episodes, and that turned into six. However, Whittle made such an impression on producer Stacy A. Littlejohn that she wrote him into the rest of the season. Whittle filmed the series in Atlanta from January to June 2012.

In 2013, Whittle appeared in an episode of the CBS drama NCIS, "Detour." In 2014, Whittle joined the cast of The CW's post-apocalyptic drama The 100 in the role of Lincoln. On 25 July 2014, at San Diego Comic-Con, it was announced that Whittle had been promoted to series regular for season 2. Around the same time, Whittle booked the recurring role of Daniel on ABC's prime-time drama Mistresses. Whittle wrapped filming for The 100 the week before he was scheduled to start production on Mistresses. Daniel Zamora is the love interest for April played by Rochelle Aytes. Whittle appeared in 10 episodes.

In January 2016, it was reported that Whittle was in talks for the lead role on another series. During an interview with AfterBuzz TV in April 2016, Whittle announced his decision to leave The 100. Whittle controversially accused the show's creator Jason Rothenberg of bullying him into leaving the series by marginalizing his character. The actor explained that once Warner Bros. Television President Peter Roth and The CW President Mark Pedowitz were made aware of the situation, he was allowed to audition for other projects.

=== 2017–present: American Gods and Nappily Ever After ===
In January 2016, it was announced that Whittle had been cast as Shadow Moon, the lead role in Starz television adaptation of Neil Gaiman's 2001 novel American Gods opposite Ian McShane. Though Whittle had no prior knowledge of the novel, he was a fan favourite pick to play Shadow when Starz announced the series in August 2015. Out of the 2,000 audition tapes submitted, Whittle was chosen out of approximately 600 actors that met with the producers. Whittle submitted 16 audition tapes over the five-month process. In September 2017 Whittle was cast opposite Sanaa Lathan in the Netflix original film, Nappily Ever After based on the novel of same name by Trisha R. Thomas. On 16 April 2018 it was announced that Whittle signed with talent agency William Morris Endeavor.

== Personal life ==
Whittle dated his Hollyoaks co-star Carley Stenson from 2007 to 2009. The two have remained close friends. Whittle dated Kirstina Colonna from 2016 until 2018.

== Filmography ==
=== Film ===
Year	Title	Role	Notes
2011	Losing Sam	Samuel	Short film
2013	Austenland	Captain East	
2018	Nappily Ever After	Clint	Netflix original movie
2024	Land of Bad	Sergeant Bishop	

=== Television ===
Year	Title	Role	Notes
2002–2007	Dream Team	Ryan Naysmith	Series regular (S6–9)
2004	Holby City	David Richards	Episode: "You Can Choose Your Friends..."
2006–2011	Hollyoaks	Calvin Valentine	243 episodes
2009	Strictly Come Dancing	Himself (contestant)	Runner-up (Series 7)
2011	Candy Cabs	Eddie Shannon	Episode: "Episode Two"
2012	Single Ladies	Charles	8 episodes
2013	NCIS	Lincoln	Episode: "Detour"
2014–2015	Mistresses	Daniel Zamora	11 episodes
2014–2016	The 100	Lincoln	Recurring (S1); Series regular (S2–3)
2017–2021	American Gods	Shadow Moon	Lead role
2019	GMA: Strahan & Sara	Himself	Episode 29; Talk show guest
2024	Secret Level	Cross (voice)	Anthology series
2025	The Rookie	Mickey	Season 7 Episode: The Mickey

=== Video games ===
Year	Title	Role	Notes
TBA	Crossfire	Delroy Cross (voice)	

== Awards and nominations ==
Year	Award	Category	Nominated Work	Result	Ref.
2007	British Soap Awards	Sexiest Male	Hollyoaks	Nominated	
2008	British Soap Awards	Sexiest Male	Hollyoaks	Nominated	
2009	British Soap Awards	Sexiest Male	Hollyoaks	Nominated	
2010	British Soap Awards	Sexiest Male	Hollyoaks	Nominated	
2010	TRIC Awards	TV Soap Personality	Hollyoaks	Won	
2018	Saturn Awards	Best Actor on Television	American Gods	Nominated	
