= Dream Team (TV series) =

British television drama series (1997–2007)

- Genre: Sports drama Family drama Soap opera
- Created by: Jane Hewland
- Based on: an original idea by David Hill
- Written by: Various
- Directed by: Various including: Carson Black, Riita Leena-Lynn, Marcus D.F. White, David Penn, Maurice Hutchinson, Terry Iland
- Starring: Final cast Alison King; Nina Muschallik; Frankie Fitzgerald; Terry Kiely; Jonathan Howard; Duncan Pow; Jessica Jane; James Floyd; Junior Nunoo; Danny Husbands; Danny Midwinter; Amy Perfect; David Ajala
- Music by: Gerry Moffett
- Country of origin: United Kingdom
- Original language: English
- No. of series: 10
- No. of episodes: 419

Production
- Producers: Various including: Carson Black, Dewi Griffiths, Sarah Conroy, Ben Harris, Nicky Poulton, John Salthouse, Sean Glynn
- Editors: Various including: Robin Nurse, Tim Porter, Jo Walker, Tim Murrell, Peter Williams, Al Morrow
- Running time: 60 minutes (including advertisements)
- Production company: Hewland International

Original release
- Network: Sky One
- Release: 14 October 1997 – 3 June 2007

Dream Team is a British sports drama television series produced by Hewland International which aired on Sky One from 1997 to 2007; it chronicled the on-field and off-field affairs of the fictional Premier League football club Harchester United. Originally broadcast in a half-hour soap opera format with two twice-weekly episodes (typically Tuesday and Thursday evenings), this continued for the first three seasons and 200 episodes, from which the show was reformatted into a prime-time one-hour drama weekly on Sunday nights where it remained for its next seven seasons until its final 419th episode.

The show's cast varied over the years with many comings and goings that reflect the natural course of a professional football club throughout various seasons. Lisa Burstow, Terry Kiely, Alison King, Danny Husbands, Andy Ansah, Emma Gilmour, Daymon Britton, John Salthouse, Philip Barantini and Francis Johnson were the most frequently cast members over the 10 seasons. Notable other actors included Martin Crewes, Ricky Whittle, Charles Venn, Michael Melia, Luke Mably, Dhaffer L'Abidine, Jamie Lomas, Robert Kazinsky, Kara Tointon and Robbie Gee. Many real life footballers and members of English sporting community including presenters and commentators also featured on the show.

== Premise ==
The show began in 1997 and centered on the Harchester United youth team. The next series, series 2 transmitted in 1998 concluding in 1999 focused on the first team for the first time and on Ian Coates, the manager, Jerry and Lynda Block, the owners of Harchester United and Luis Amor Rodriguez, star striker and soon-to-be lover of Lynda. The end of the series resulted in Harchester winning the FA Cup.

Series 3, that followed focused on the club fighting against relegation, qualifying for the highly acclaimed Champions League and being demoted to the Football League for financial irregularities and corruption after they were found guilty of match fixing.

As the show developed, the storylines became more and more extravagant, with the character death toll rising significantly in later series. Some of the most outlandish storylines included a striker being shot by a sniper after winning the FA Cup, a fan being brought onto the pitch to play during a game, and later becoming a Premier League star, and a goalkeeper in gambling debt holding the entire team hostage before being killed by a SWAT team. With declining viewing figures and repetitive storylines, Sky decided not to renew the Dream Team contract, and in April 2006, the director of programmes at Sky One, Richard Woolfe, confirmed the show would not return after the tenth series.

The tenth series began on 29 October 2006, the final episode being broadcast on 3 June 2007, with viewers left unaware of which characters survived a massive fire that ripped through the Dragon's Lair during the final Premier League game of the season. However it is hinted that Harchester United win the Premier League thanks to a last minute goal from Jason Porter. The last ever song to be played on the programme was "Cast No Shadow" by Oasis.

The main storyline of series ten revolved around "Dragonslayer", a mysterious poster on the club's fansite revealing the innermost secrets of the club. It was ultimately this storyline that resulted in the arson attack that ended the series. Following the announcement of Dream Team being axed, many of the main cast members left the programme at the start of series ten. These included Alex Dempsey, Lynda Block and Ryan Naysmith.

== Cast ==
=== Main cast ===
Cast members who featured most frequently during all ten seasons, this list may not include lead characters from certain seasons.

- Lisa Burstow as Sandra Greene (1997–2004)
- Terry Kiely as Karl Fletcher (1997–2007)
- Alison King as Lynda Block (1998–2007)
- Danny Husbands as Danny Sullivan (2001–2007)
- Emma Gilmour as Kelly James (1998–2000)
- Daymon Britton as Sean Hocknell (1997–1999)
- John Salthouse as Frank Patcham (1997–2007)
- Philip Barantini as Billy O'Neill (1998–2000)
- Francis Johnson as Ian Coates (1997–1999)
- Michael Melia as Jerry Block (1998–2000)
- Ray MacAllan as Jeff Stein (1999–2004)
- Martin Crewes as Luis Amor Rodriguez (1998–2000)
- Ricky Whittle as Ryan Naysmith (2002–2007)
- Clinton Kenyon as Warren Masters (1997–1999)
- Charles Venn as Curtis Alexander (2001–2006)
- Nina Muschallik as Nikki Peggs (2001–2004)
- Angela Saunders as Natasha Parker (2000–2004)
- Luke Mably as Scott Lucas (1999–2002)
- Jim Alexander as Jamie Parker (2000–2003)
- Mark Moraghan as Ray Wyatt (1999–2006)

== Harchester United ==
Harchester United was the fictional Premier League football club featured in the series, known by their nickname "The Dragons" and club motto 'Contende Ad Caelum' meaning Strive for the Skies and/or Be The Best. Its geographical location was north of Birmingham and Coventry, and two miles east of Tamworth, a Midlands setting chosen so as not to alienate football fans from either the North or South. Its filming locations however, started with Watford's Vicarage Road doubling as Addison Road for the show's first two seasons (1997–99) with a move to a new stadium, The Dragons' Lair seeing Milwall's The New Den becoming The Dragons' home for the next eight seasons.

== Production ==
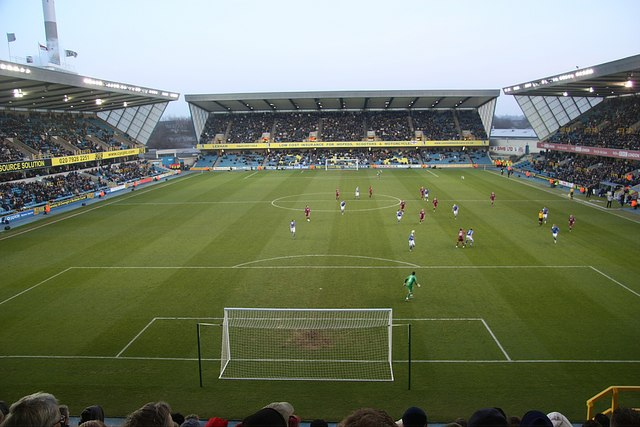
Millwall's The New Den was used as Harchester United's Stadium

The shows's production overseen by Hewland International and aired on the Sky One channel between 1997 and 2007. It was one of the earliest examples of 'subscription' television drama, arriving at a time when Sky television was the leading source in the genre.

A unique identity to hold, Dream Team wasn't the first UK-made drama to crack this particular market, that accolade belonging to Galaxy's soap Jupiter Moon in 1990, a show only curtailed by the merger of the channel's owner, British Satellite Broadcasting, with rivals Sky Television, shuttering virtually all of BSB's output in favour of Sky's. Seven years later, Dream Team began airing on Sky One in the soap opera format, with two twice-weekly episodes (typically Tuesday and Thursday evenings) broadcast in the half-hour format. This continued for the first three seasons and 200 episodes, from which the show was reformatted into a prime-time one-hour drama weekly on Sunday nights where it remained for its next seven seasons until its final 419th episode.

The Dream Team series used a technique called rotoscoping to create the live action football sequences, that would put players from the clubs competing against real-life players and teams from the Premier League, EFL Championship, and internationally in the UEFA Cup, and Champions League.

Harchester United team kits were created by real kit manufacturers and were also available to buy whilst the show was on the air. These kits were made by PONY for series one (1997–1998), Le Coq Sportif for series two to seven (1998–2003), and later Valsport for series eight to ten (2004–2007).

It has been theorised that the third kit worn by Everton players during the 2014–15 season were inspired by those donned by Harchester United.

== Episodes ==
419 episodes were made over ten series. For the first three series, the show aired in a half-hour format of Tuesday and Thursday nights, with an hour-long omnibus airing on Saturday/Sunday mornings. The final episodes for series two and three were both an hour in duration and after receiving strong ratings in both cases, starting in series four, the show switched to a single hour-long episode on Sunday evenings.

Series	Start date	End date	Episodes
1	14 October 1997	20 May 1998	64
2	1 September 1998	20 May 1999	76
3	21 September 1999	18 May 2000	62
4	1 October 2000	15 April 2001	26
5	16 September 2001	15 May 2002	32
6	6 October 2002	18 May 2003	32
7	28 September 2003	16 May 2004	32
8	17 October 2004	29 May 2005	32
9	16 October 2005	14 May 2006	31
10	29 October 2006	3 June 2007	32

== Foreign audience ==
In the United States, Fox Soccer Channel (like Sky, a part of News Corporation) aired Dream Team as part of their schedule outside of prime periods. The series also aired in India on STAR Sports, in Ukraine on ICTV, in Serbia on Studio B television, in France on france 4, in Montenegro on TV In, in Estonia on TV4, in Bosnia and Herzegovina on BHT1 and in North Macedonia on MRT 1. It also aired on Botswana's national television station Btv, in Kenya on STV, and in South Africa on SABC 1.

== See also ==
- Footballers' Wives, British TV drama that focussed heavily on the lives of the players and their wives from fictional Premier League team Earls Park FC.
- Mike Bassett: England Manager, 2001 British mockumentary comedy film about a coach who is hired from the lower leagues to manage the England team at the World Cup. The movie also used a small number of Dream Team actors as players.
- Mike Bassett: Manager, British comedy series, follow-up to the film which sees an unsuccessful coach on a bad run of form taking over as the new manager of his late father's former team.
- Ted Lasso, an Apple TV+ series featuring an American football coach who is appointed as manager of a Premier League side, despite having no experience in association football.
