= Sunday Times Rich List 2016 =

Annual survey

The Sunday Times Rich List 2016 is the 28th annual survey of the wealthiest people resident in the United Kingdom, published by The Sunday Times on 24 April 2016. Long-term compiler Philip Beresford was joined by Robert Watts for the 2016 list.

An estimated wealth of £103 million is required for entry in the 2016 list. Newly added to the list for the first time, and ranked in the top 100, are John Grayken, Christo Wiese, Sunil Vaswani & family, and Martin Moller.

== Top 20 fortunes ==
2016		Name	Citizenship	Source of wealth	2015	
Rank	Net worth £ bn	Name	Citizenship	Source of wealth	Rank	Net worth £ bn
1 ▲	£13.10 ▲	David and Simon Reuben	United Kingdom	Property and Internet	5	£9.70
2	£13.00	Sri and Gopi Hinduja	India	Industry and Finance	2	£13.00
3 ▼	£11.59 ▼	Leonard Blavatnik	United States	Investment, music and media	1	£13.17
4 ▼	£11.00	Galen Weston and George G. Weston and family	Canada & United Kingdom	Retailing	3	£11.00
5 ▲	£9.78 ▲	Ernesto and Kirsty Bertarelli	Switzerland & United Kingdom	Pharmaceuticals	6	£9.45
6 ▲	£9.35 ▲	The Duke of Westminster	United Kingdom	Property	9	£8.56
7 ▲	£9.15 ▲	Charlene de Carvalho-Heineken and Michel de Carvalho	Netherlands	Inheritance, banking, brewing (Heineken)	12	£7.15
8	£8.70	Kirsten Rausing and Jörn Rausing	Sweden	Inheritance and investment (Tetra Pak)	8	£8.70
9 ▲	£8.60 ▲	Hans Rausing and family	Sweden	Packaging (Tetra Pak)	14	£6.40
10 ▼	£7.58 ▼	Alisher Usmanov	Russia	Mining and Investment	4	£9.80
11 ▼	£7.12 ▼	Lakshmi Mittal and family	India	Steel	7	£9.20
12 ▲	£7.00 ▲	Sir David Barclay and Sir Frederick Barclay	United Kingdom	Property, media, internet retailing	13	£6.50
13 ▼	£6.40 ▼	Roman Abramovich	Russia	Oil and industry	10	£7.29
14 ▼	£6.30 ▼	John Fredriksen and family	Cyprus & Norway	Shipping and oil services	11	£7.24
15	£5.84 ▼	Mohamed Bin Issa Al Jaber and family	Saudi Arabia	Hotels, food and industry (MBI Group)	15	£5.94
16 ▲	£5.70 ▲	Charles Cadogan, 8th Earl Cadogan and family	United Kingdom	Property	18	£4.80
17 ▲	£5.00 ▲	Sir James Dyson	United Kingdom	Industry (Dyson)	22	£3.50
18 ▲	£4.83 ▲	Nicky Oppenheimer	South Africa	Diamonds (De Beers)	19	£4.55
19 ▲	£4.52 ▲	Sir Richard Branson	United Kingdom	Industry (Virgin Group)	20	£4.10
20	£4.41	John Grayken	Ireland	Property and Investment (Lone Star Funds)	-	-

== See also ==
- Forbes list of billionaires
