= Leenhouts =

Leenhouts is a Dutch surname. Notable people with the surname include:

- Paul Leenhouts, Dutch musician
- Pieter Willem Leenhouts (1926–2004), Dutch botanist
- Nelson and Norman Leenhouts, creators of Home Properties
