= Island House, Birmingham =

Historic building in England, 1912–2012

Island House
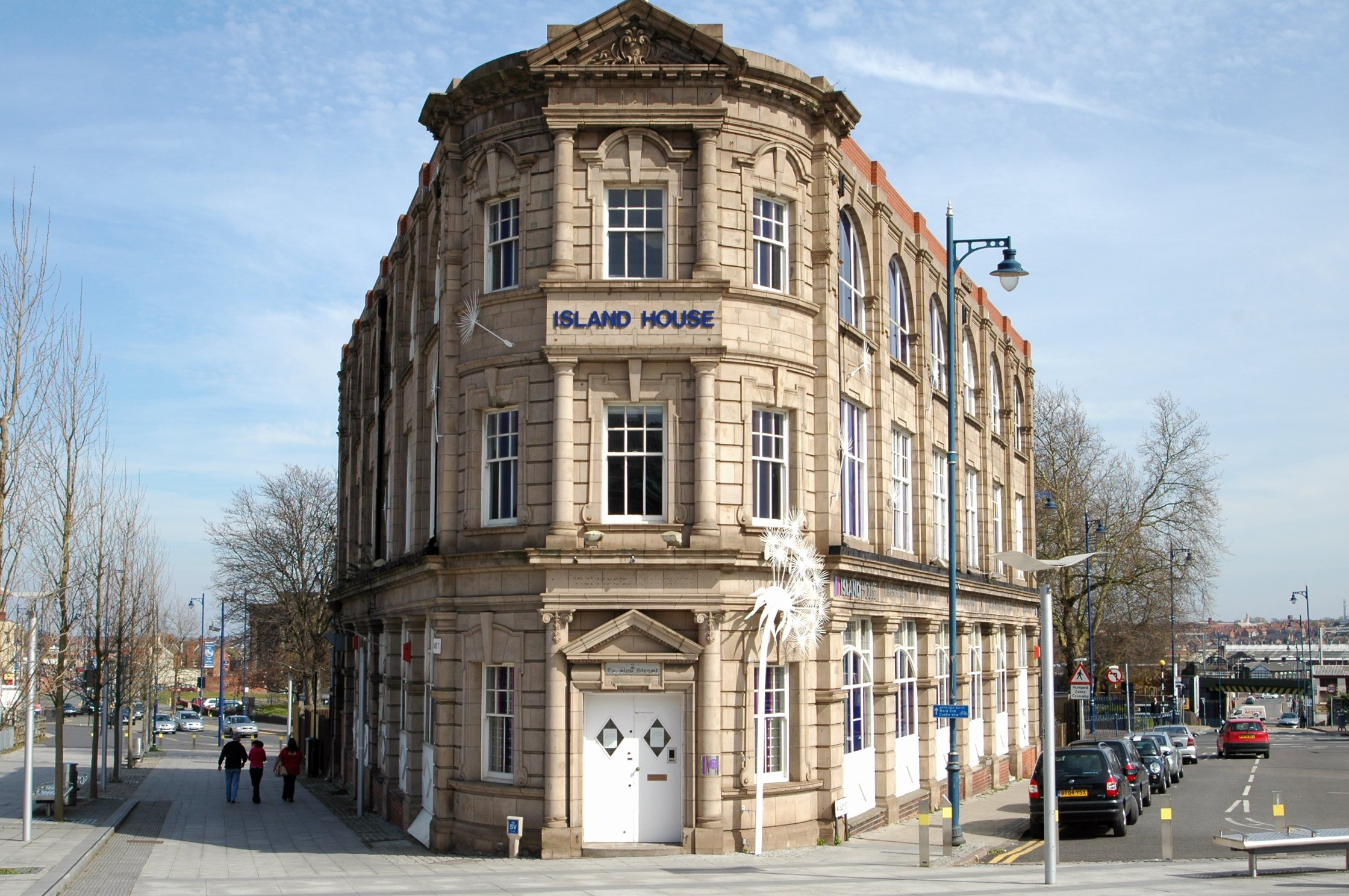
- Island house in 2007

General information
- Status: Demolished
- Type: Office
- Location: Birmingham, England
- Coordinates: 52.4806°N 1.8907°W
- Completed: 1912
- Demolished: 2012

Technical details
- Floor count: 3

Design and construction
- Architect: G. E. Pepper

Island House was a locally listed building in Birmingham's Eastside area, with a roughly triangular footprint. It was built in 1912 by the architect G. E. Pepper, in the Edwardian Mannerist style, ornately decorated with both Ionic and Doric decorations. Originally it was designed to be used as office building and warehouse for the prominent "Messrs Churchill & Co" machine tool company. The opening ceremony of Island House was held in 1913.

Located next to the Masshouse developments, Island House was occupied by teams from Birmingham City Council's arts team, including Film Birmingham, Urban Fusion and ArtsFest. The building was used in conjunction with other establishments in the city, including the Ikon Gallery.

Although Island House's future was jeopardised by the City Park Gate development, the building (along with a local public house, the Fox and Grapes) was included in these plans; with a refurbishment and an upwards extension designed by Make Architects for Quintain.

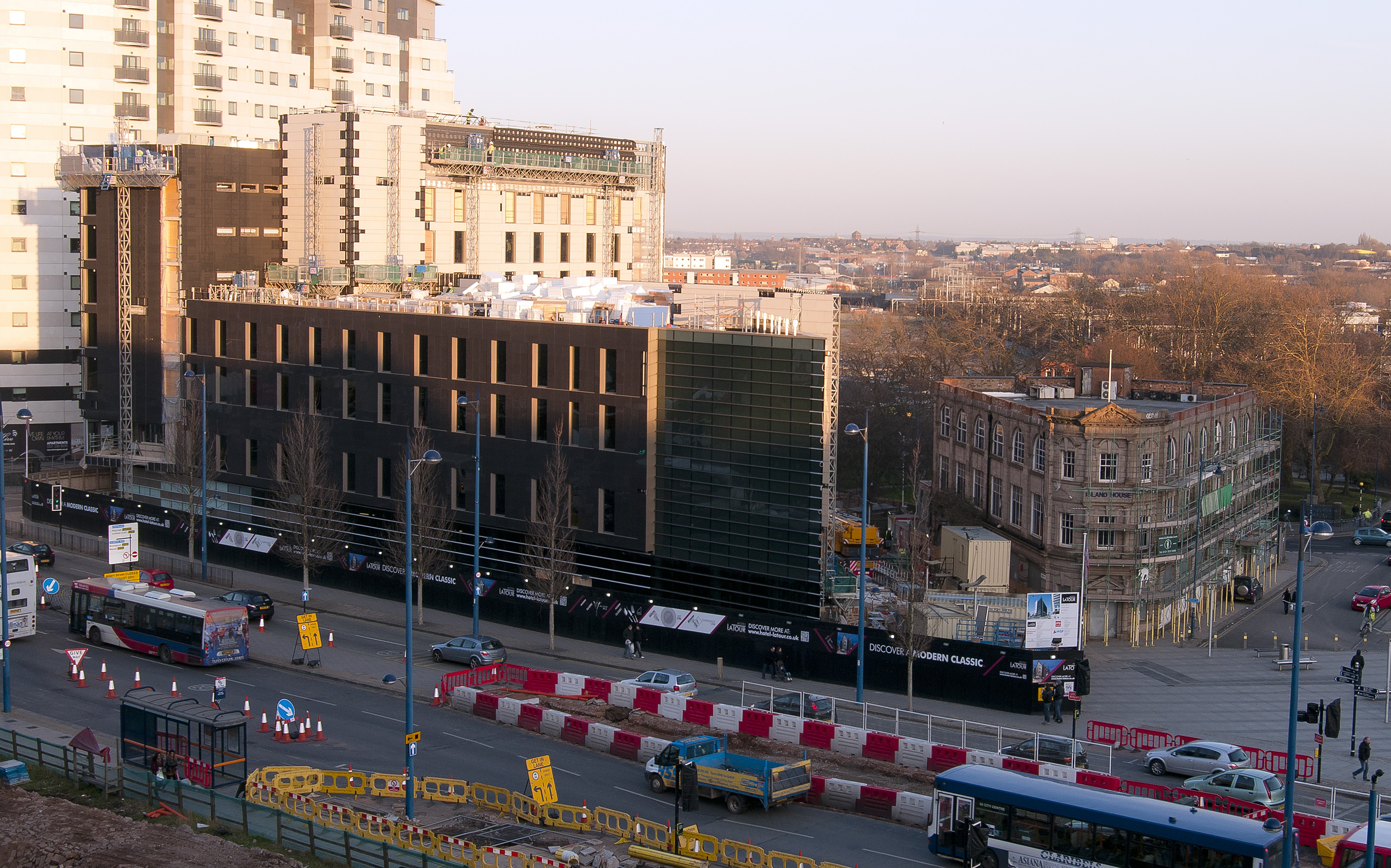
Shortly before demolition in February 2012

In early 2012 there was a campaign to save Island House, after Quintain had applied for permission to demolish. Permission, in principle, was given by Birmingham City Council Planning Committee on 26 January 2012, however, it emerged there was an outstanding Section 106 agreement for refurbishment. Quintain applied for permission to vary the Section 106 agreement, but later withdrew the application, claiming that since no building work had commenced they did not need to honour the Section 106 Agreement.

The building was subsequently demolished in 2012.
