= New England Quarter =

Mixed-use development in Brighton and Hove, England

Coordinates: 50°49′55″N 0°8′19″W

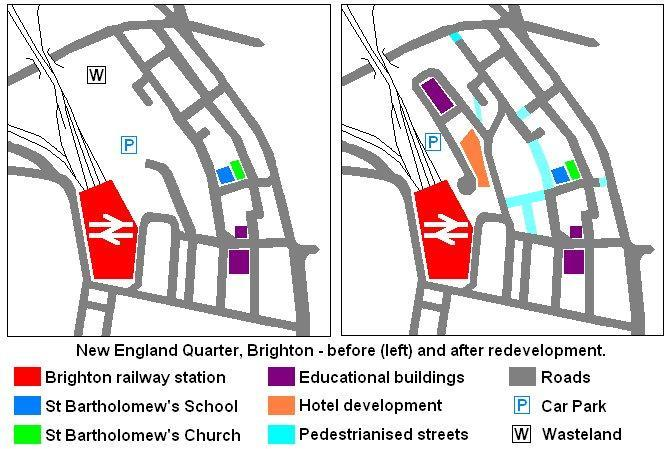
Diagram showing the layout of streets and significant buildings in the New England Quarter area before and after its redevelopment

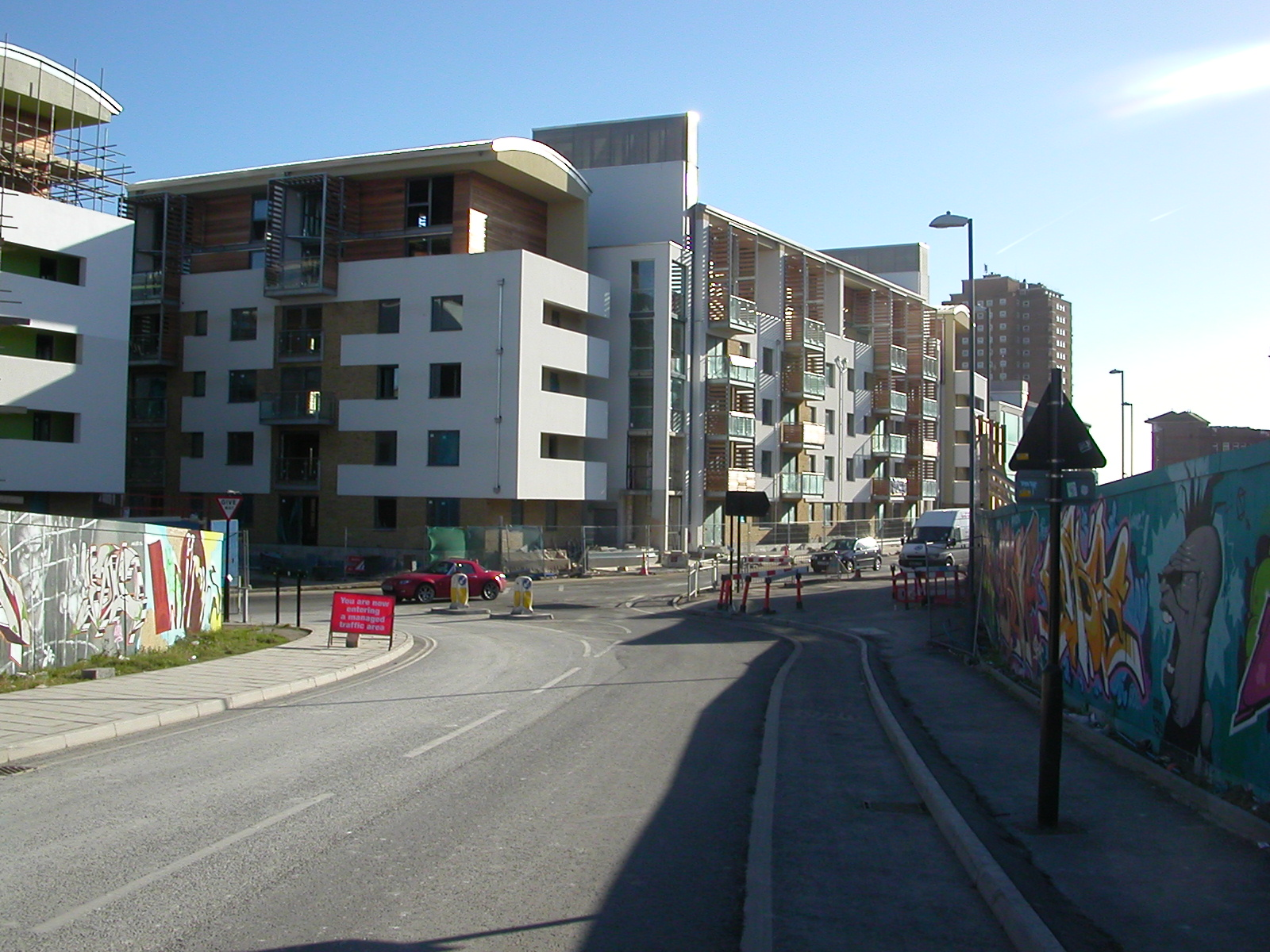
Looking down Stroudley Road towards Blocks A-D

The New England Quarter is a mixed-use development in the city of Brighton and Hove, England. It was built between 2004 and 2008 on the largest brownfield site in the city, adjacent to Brighton railway station. Most parts of the scheme have been finished, but other sections are still being built and one major aspect of the original plan was refused planning permission.

The site, a steeply sloping hillside between a main railway line and one of Brighton's main roads, had been the home of a railway locomotive works and goods yard for more than a century. High-density housing was built at the same time and surrounded the railway buildings. From the 1960s, the area fell into decline: the works and goods yard were closed and demolished, and most of the housing was cleared. This left large areas of derelict land which attracted small-scale redevelopment and transient commercial enterprises. Proposals for redevelopment were made from the 1980s onwards; in 2001 a master plan was granted planning permission by Brighton and Hove City Council. Site clearance work followed, and construction began in 2004.

The New England Quarter consists of separately planned areas (called "Blocks" in the master plan) connected by new or altered road infrastructure and pedestrian links. Land use includes private and council housing of various styles and configurations, office and retail space, a college, a hotel, public space and community facilities. Some of the residential development aims to meet high environmental and sustainability standards, and green space is being provided on former railway land.

The scheme has attracted criticism from various sources, and certain aspects and proposals have been particularly controversial. A planned 42-storey hotel and residential building on one block—which was not in the original plan and for which planning permission was later denied—was opposed by many local people and politicians, and was eventually rejected by a government minister on appeal. The decision to allow a large supermarket branch to be built in the middle of the development was also unpopular. A campaign group was formed to co-ordinate and raise the awareness of people's concerns.

== Location ==
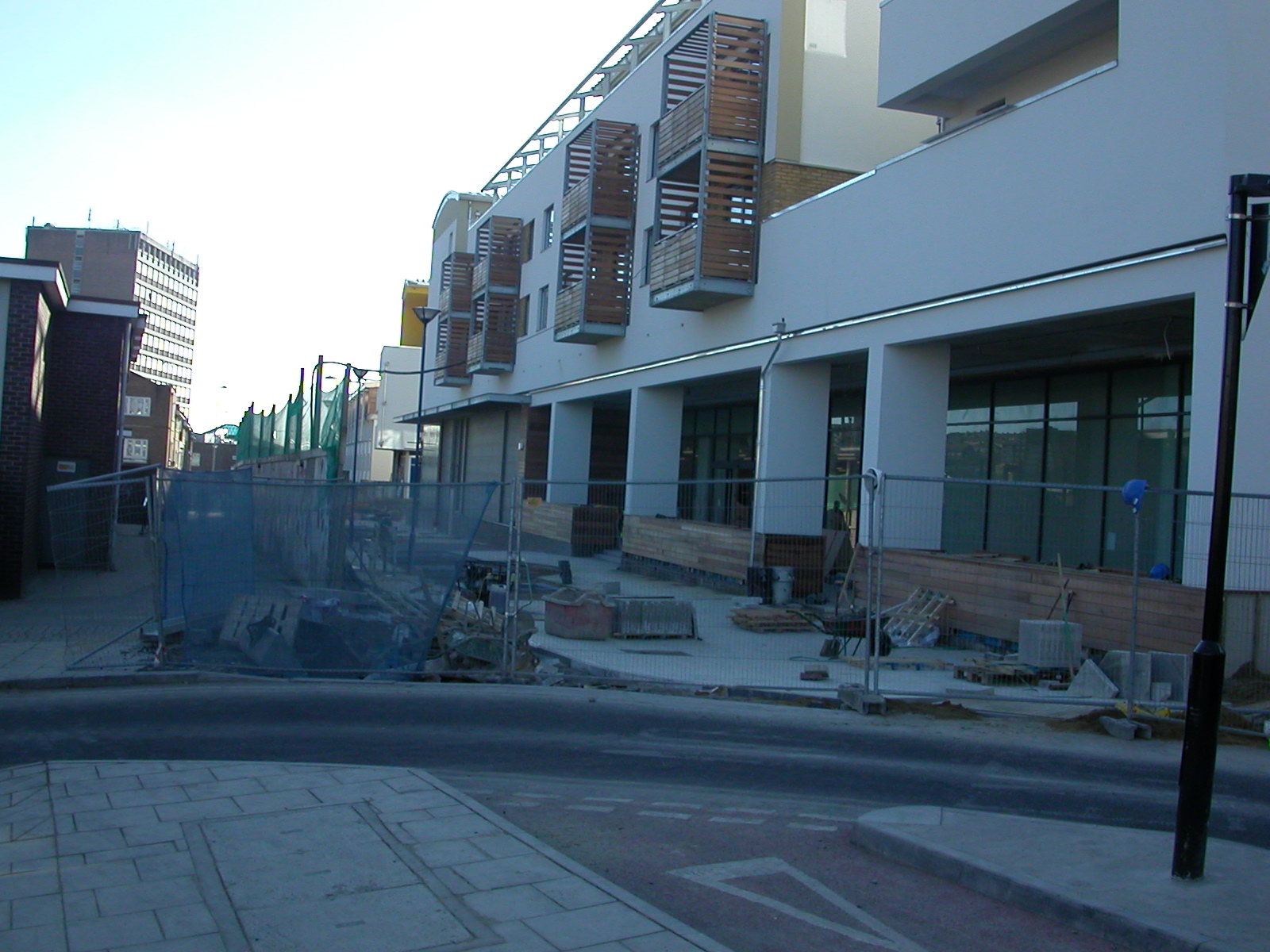
The former route of New England Street in the process of being pedestrianised

The New England Quarter is in a central location in Brighton, the main urban centre in the city of Brighton and Hove. It is immediately east of the railway station and approximately ¾ mile north of the seafront. It covers a broadly rectangular area of 8.7 hectares (21 acres), bounded by:

- To the north: New England Road, leading to the Seven Dials area
- To the east: The A23 London Road
- To the south: Trafalgar Street, leading downhill from the station towards St Peter's Church, and forming the northern boundary of the North Laine area
- To the west: the railway station and its associated trackwork and sidings

(Some sources measure the site differently, and accordingly define it as smaller or larger than the size given in the master plan.)

== History ==
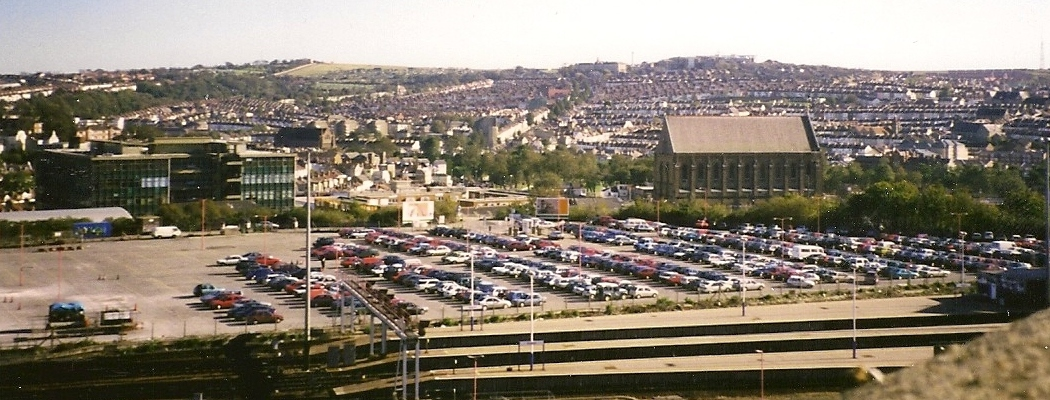
A large part of the site was taken up by the car park of Brighton railway station. (Picture taken in 1996)

The completion of the Brighton Main Line from London to Brighton in 1841 encouraged high-density housing development on the hill west of London Road. Between this area and the railway line and station stood Brighton's steam locomotive works and the lower part of the station goods yard. The first locomotive was produced here in 1852. By 1896, the works employed more than 2,200 people in the manufacture and maintenance of locomotives for the London, Brighton and South Coast Railway. The works and its associated buildings were situated on an artificial plateau dug into the side of the chalk slopes, with the railway line on top, the works at a lower level and the lower goods yard beneath, 9 metres (30 ft) below track level. (The works had been extended on a pier across the lower goods yard at one point.) Production lasted until 1957, after which the buildings survived for some time before being cleared in 1966 to make way for the largest car park on what was then British Rail's Southern Region. The lower goods yard section towards Trafalgar Street was no longer used by British Rail after the early 1970s, although it did not finally close until 1980. Part of the land was incorporated into the car park, and the rest saw a mixture of uncoordinated uses, such as small office blocks and used car dealerships. Many of the houses adjoining the goods yard were demolished in 1962 and 1968, and some tower blocks were built nearby. Further north, a large multi-storey car park was built in 1976 close to St Bartholomew's Church.

Various proposals were put forward for more effective use of the land. The first was in 1989, when a mixed-use development, centred on a new pedestrianised square outside St Bartholomew's Church, was planned. It would have included a supermarket, offices, houses and other shops, and a relief road designed to take traffic away from the congested London Road. The Environmental Services Department of what was then Brighton Borough Council produced a planning brief for the site in October 1993, stating a desire to "recreate in the area west of London Road a vital, urban, mixed use townscape which links a regenerated and environmentally enhanced London Road shopping centre with North Laine and the station". The desire to use the site to its full potential was increased when city status was awarded to Brighton and Hove in 2000; it was the largest brownfield site in the city.

== Development of the scheme ==
URBED (the Urban and Economic Development Group), a not-for-profit urban regeneration consultancy, designed and developed the master plan for the scheme on behalf of the New England Consortium. This is a group of companies and interested parties which together have the overall responsibility for the scheme, including Network Rail Infrastructure Ltd, J. Sainsbury Developments Ltd and Quintain Estates and Development (QED). The land was originally owned by British Rail, but passed to Railtrack when the railway system was privatised in the mid-1990s. It was sold to the New England Consortium in 1997. An initial planning application, including a new Sainsbury's supermarket, was rejected by the council in November 1997; the rejection was subsequently upheld on appeal in September 1998. URBED were then asked to develop a new master plan for the site. This design statement was published in July 2001, and was granted planning permission by Brighton & Hove City Council at the end of 2002. Construction work on the site began on 19 July 2004.

== Overview of the scheme ==
The scheme is a mixed-use development, consisting of a wide range of residential, commercial, educational and community buildings, transport-related infrastructure and public space. The land has been divided into a series of "blocks", identified by letters, to which different types of development have been allocated. (Letters H, I and N are not used.)

Block(s)	Use	Location	Details
A–D	Residential; Community	Cheapside–New England Street–Fleet Street	Collectively known as the "Core Site". City Point (Barratt Developments); training and resource centre
C	Commercial	New England Street–Ann Square	Sainsbury's supermarket, three other retail units and office space
E–F	Residential; Community	Stroudley Road–Fleet Street–New England Street	Crest Nicholson/BioRegional Quintain joint venture: private and social housing, community centre
G	Residential; Commercial	Stroudley Road–Cross Street	Gladstone Row: Three-storey townhouses; 900 square metres (9,700 sq ft) workspace building
J	Commercial	Stroudley Road–Fleet Street	4-star hotel (Indigo; 94 beds; *Previous planning: Radisson; 250 beds)
K	Commercial	Stroudley Road (south of Billinton Way)	3-star hotel (Jurys Inn; 234 beds), conference facilities and offices
L–M	Educational	Stroudley Road (north of Billinton Way)	European headquarters of Study Group International, including Bellerbys College and Embassy CES language school
O–R	Car parking	Stroudley Road	New multi-storey car park for Brighton station

== Residential areas ==
When the scheme is complete, at least 355 new homes will be available, consisting of a mixture of standard houses, apartments and townhouses, and able to support a population of approximately 1,000 people.

In 2005, a joint venture was formed between housebuilder Crest Nicholson and environmental project and design group BioRegional Quintain Ltd to acquire part of the site (Blocks E and F) and provide 172 of the new homes, including the affordable housing stock as mentioned above. The homes will be a mixture of one-, two- and three-bedroom flats and "eco-studios", contained within one six-storey and one ten-storey tower. This section of the development will also incorporate 925 square metres (9,960 sq ft) of community space, to include a community centre, and 1,134 square metres (12,210 sq ft) of floorspace for commercial use.

The Southern Counties division of major British housebuilder Barratt Developments was responsible for building City Point, the other section of the private housing development. This covers Blocks A, B, C and D, to the south of the Crest Nicholson/Bioregional development.

=== Block A ===
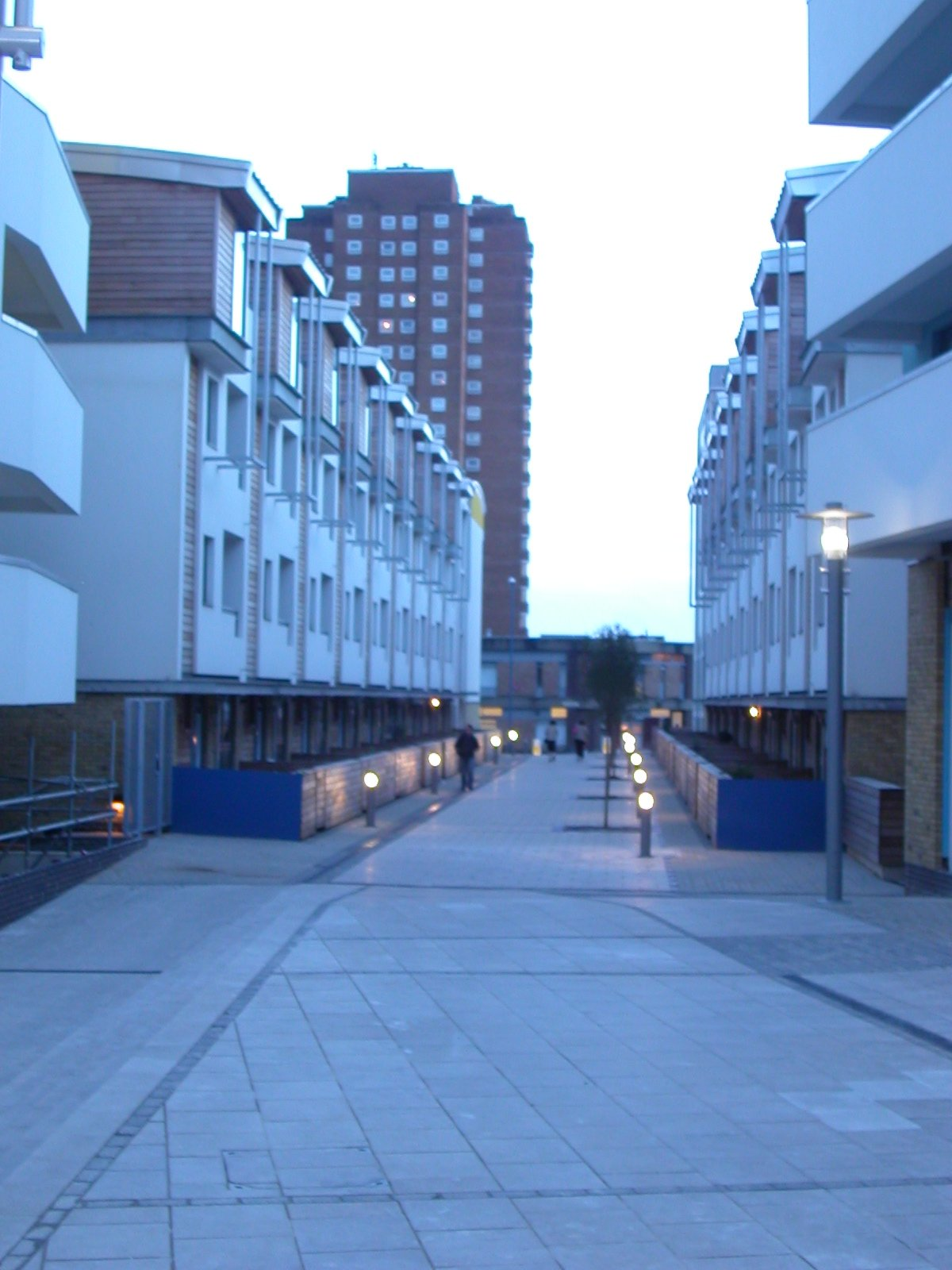
Kingscote Way looking south, forming the boundary between Block A (left) and Block B (right)

This covers an area of 4,484 square metres (48,270 sq ft) and is bounded by the now partly pedestrianised New England Street (the former course of which it partially encroaches upon), Cheapside, a new pedestrian right of way (Kingscote Way) and Blocks B and C. The Harvest Forestry, a low-rise building with small dome-shaped turrets at each corner, previously stood here. The block has been designated a high-density, urban housing area, consisting of eight three-storey townhouses, each with four bedrooms, fronting New England Street; nine townhouses with roof gardens and small rear gardens—also with four bedrooms, and fronting the new pedestrian route; and two apartment blocks with 21 two-bedroom flats. The apartment block fronting the new Ann Square (facing north) has retail units at street level (total area 245 square metres (2,640 sq ft)). The housing has 17 allocated parking spaces.

=== Block B ===
Covering 3,953 square metres (42,550 sq ft), this block lies west of Block A and adjoins Fleet Street, part of the new main road through the New England Quarter. It contains a very high density of housing: 119 residential units per hectare (current government planning policy stipulates a minimum of 30 residential units per hectare, but no maximum density is advised). A retail unit and 47 residential units, none with allocated parking, make up the block. There are nine four-bedroom townhouses, 17 two-bedroom flats, 13 three-bedroom flats and eight two-bedroom duplexes. A single unit of 124 square metres (1,330 sq ft) was designated for use as a shop or café; it is occupied by a fast food restaurant. The apartment blocks in Block B are four and five storeys in height. The central area enclosed by the block has been developed as a courtyard.

=== Block C ===
The residential element of this large (6,432 square metres (69,230 sq ft)), complex block consists of 94 units, comprising four one-bedroom flats, 54 two-bedroom flats and 36 three-bedroom flats. These are all situated above the Sainsbury's supermarket, which forms a major component of the block. The flats are arranged across two apartment blocks, connected by a pedestrian route and sharing two courtyards. No parking is allocated to any of the flats. The blocks are each four storeys in height, on top of the height of the supermarket.

=== Block D ===
This is another mixed-use block, with a training centre at street level. The residential element within the 3,953 square metres (42,550 sq ft) area consists of 56 units: eight one-bedroom flats, two one-bedroom duplexes, 34 two-bedroom flats and 12 three-bedroom flats. Most of the building is five storeys high (the lowest floor being the training centre, with four residential floors above), but a further three storeys are incorporated within a tower in one corner. Again, no parking is allocated to this block.

=== Blocks E and F ===
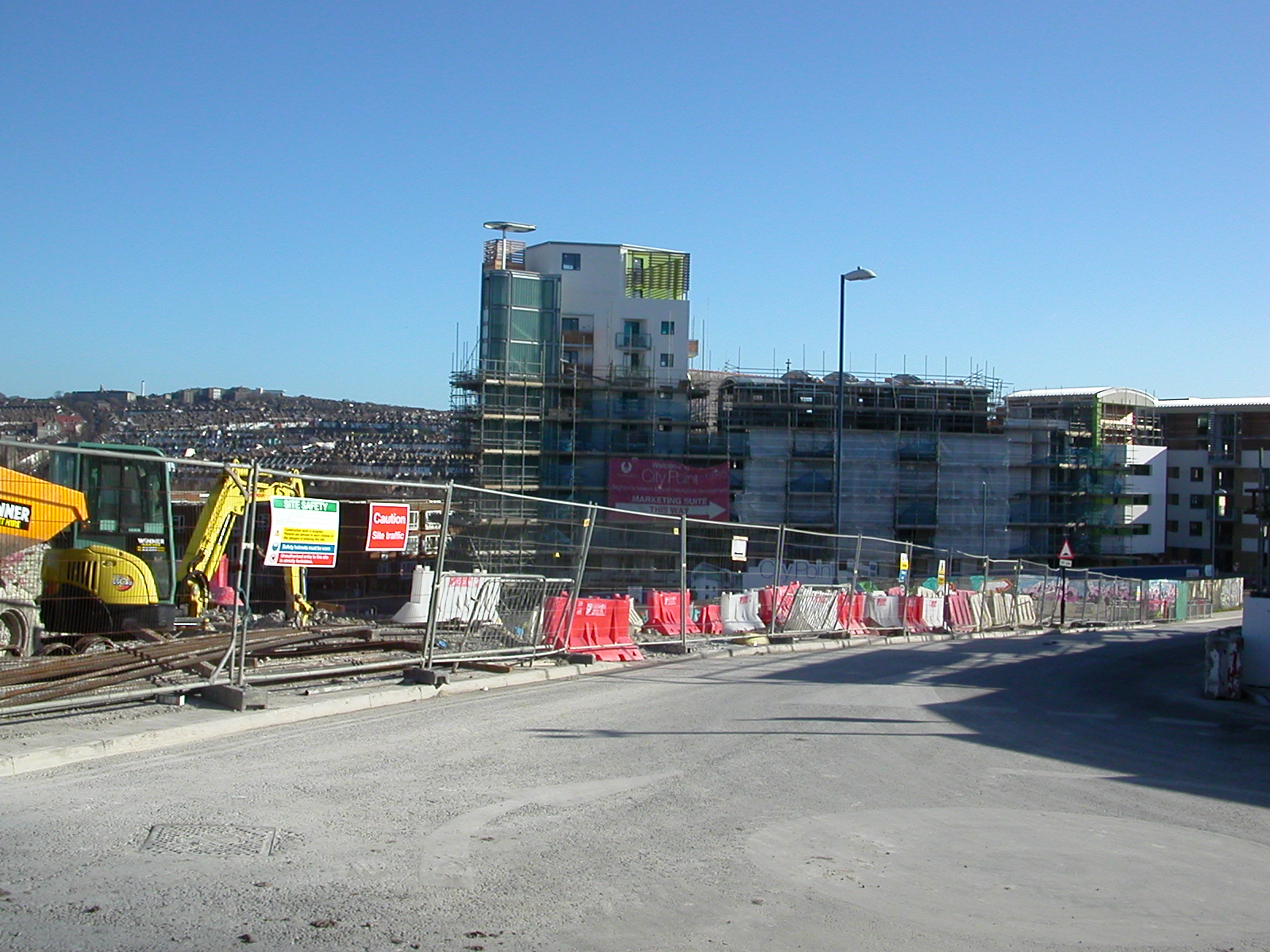
A view down Stroudley Road, with the future Blocks E and F development in the foreground, and the already developed buildings of Blocks C and D in the centre

These blocks are being developed by Crest Nicholson BioRegional Quintain LLP as an environmentally friendly set of "eco-apartments" called One Brighton. Construction started in autumn 2007. It consists of 172 apartments (369 beds in total), commercial space and a community facility. The scheme has been conceived to enable people living and working there to lead sustainable lifestyles. Of these blocks' housing stock, 30% has been classified by the developers as affordable housing, which will be managed by an independent housing association.

=== Block G ===
This will consist of three terraces of housing on top of a retaining wall alongside Stroudley Road. The ground area is 2,092 square metres (22,520 sq ft), of which 883 square metres (9,500 sq ft) will be allocated to B1-category office and utility space. The residential elements of the development are to be three storeys high, with balconies overlooking the "green corridor" immediately to the east. No off-street car parking has been planned for this block, but some on-street parking may be provided.

== Commercial areas ==
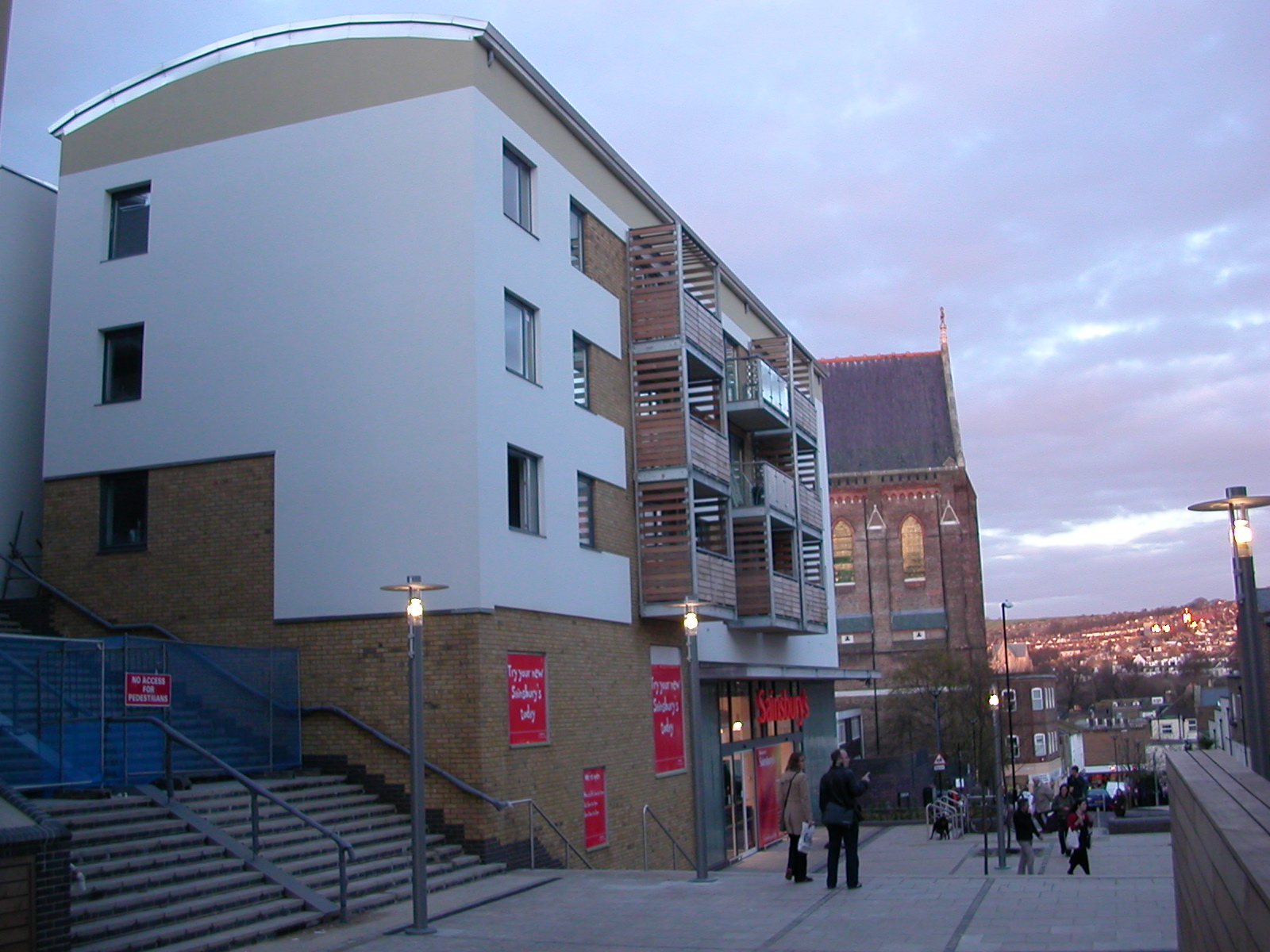
Sainsbury's on its first day of trading, showing Ann Square in front and residential development above

A 4,180 square metres (45,000 sq ft) Sainsbury's supermarket (total "sales area" accessible to the public: 2,323 square metres (25,000 sq ft)) forms a major component both of Block C and of the New England Quarter itself. It extends across the east–west space of the block; as a result of the steeply sloping land at this point, the store frontage faces the newly built Ann Square and the newly pedestrianised New England Street, while the rear is at basement (sub-ground floor) level. A car park with 194 spaces for shoppers has been created beneath the store, and is linked to it by travelators. The service area and loading bay extend beneath the new road between Blocks C and D, and into the ground beneath Block D. The new store opened on 1 March 2007. It replaced a smaller outlet in London Road, which had opened in 1974 and which had seen little refurbishment since the original planning application for a Sainsbury's on the New England Quarter site was put through in 1997.

In November 2005, Block K was granted planning permission for a four-storey office development (B1-category), in addition to the hotel and public open space therein. The amount of office space had been reduced, in favour of more hotel space, since the date when outline planning permission was granted for the New England Quarter development as a whole (September 2003). 2,793 square metres (30,060 sq ft) of office space will be provided, although the original master plan had indicated 3,159 square metres (34,000 sq ft). Blocks A and Block B have also been provided with a small amount of space for retail use.

== Hotels ==
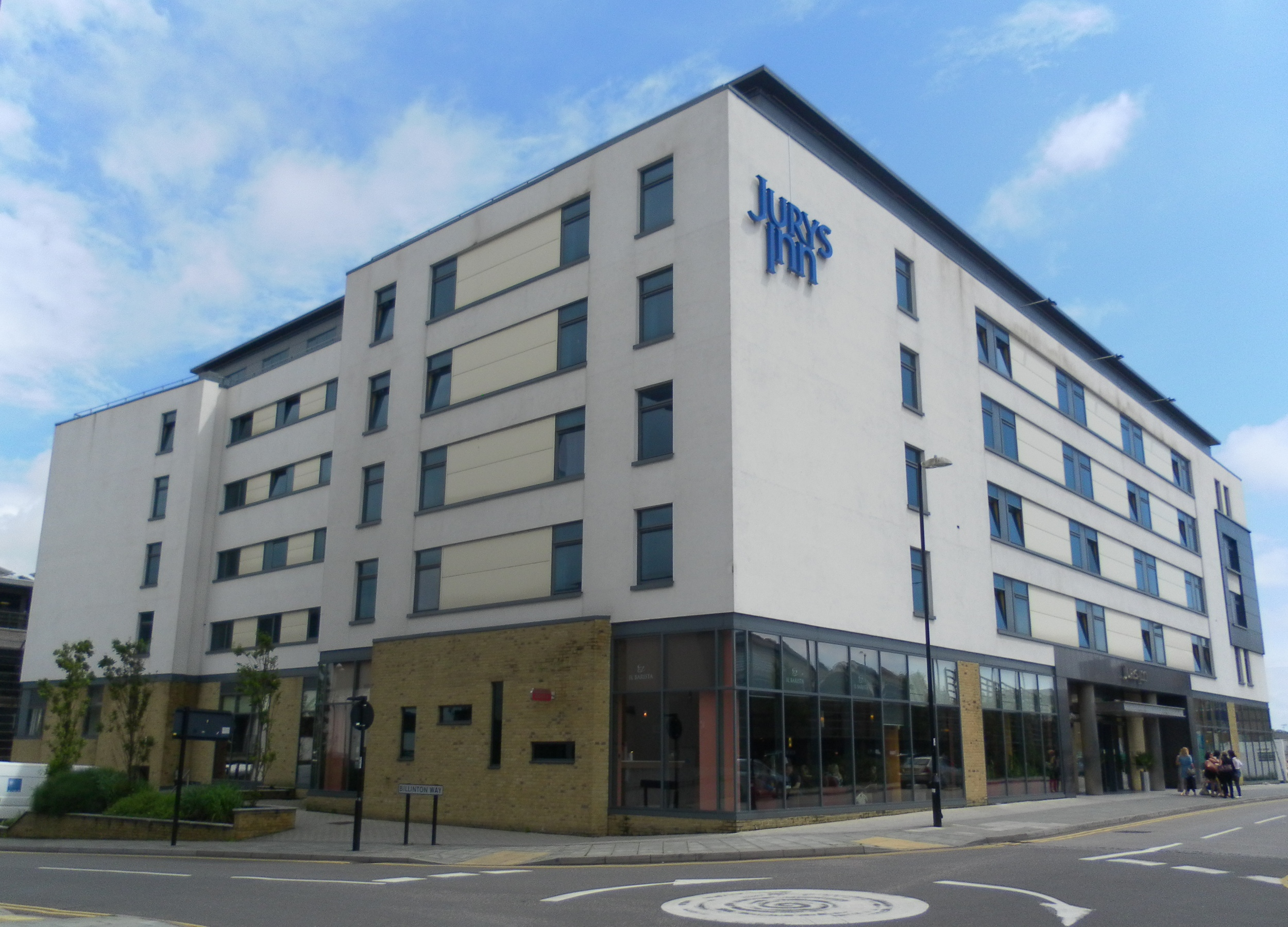
The Jurys Inn Hotel fills Block K. It opened in late 2007.

Block J, which has a ground area of 3,707 square metres (39,900 sq ft), has been granted planning permission for a luxury (four-star) hotel, with around 250 beds and a range of facilities including a restaurant, swimming pool and conference venue, taking the total floor space to 21,367 square metres (229,990 sq ft) spread across five or six storeys. The URBED master plan states that "no associated parking [has been provided] as it is anticipated that most guests will arrive by train", as the station is immediately adjacent.

Controversy arose over a proposal—raised after the master plan was approved in principle—to build a 42-storey tower incorporating a large number of residential units and other facilities in addition to the already-approved hotel. The skyscraper was proposed by the Beetham Organization, a British property investment company, and would have been similar in scale and appearance to other recently built "Beetham Towers" in Liverpool, Manchester and Birmingham. Architects Allies and Morrison drew up the design.

There was much criticism of the design, its height and the proposed location, both from local councillors (of all parties) and from people in the local community. Planning permission was denied in April 2005, but the Beetham Organization lodged an appeal and a public inquiry was held in November 2006. Ruth Kelly, the Secretary of State for Communities and Local Government, was responsible for deciding whether to overrule the council's decision and approve the tower. A final decision on the site was initially expected in February 2007, but the inquiry eventually continued until 17 May 2007, when the decision to refuse planning permission was upheld. As well as agreeing with the council's original argument that the tower would not fit into the local area and would have a harmful effect on surrounding conservation areas (such as the North Laine and St Bartholomew's Church), Kelly stated that the proposal would give insufficient benefit in terms of regeneration of the area, and did not offer enough outdoor leisure and recreation space. The future of the Block J site is undecided as a result of this; however, within four days of the decision, the Beetham Organization announced that it intended to submit plans for an alternative scheme, which it would develop in consultation with the city council.

Block K was acquired by the Jurys Doyle Hotel Group PLC, which operated hotels under the "Jurys Inn" brand until it sold its portfolio in 2007. It houses a three-star hotel, built over five and six storeys, as well as offices and public space. It has a floor area of 10,518 square metres (113,210 sq ft), and there are 234 bedrooms, various meeting rooms and similar facilities. The hotel was built by Northern Irish construction group McAleer & Rushe. It opened in late 2007.

== Education and community ==
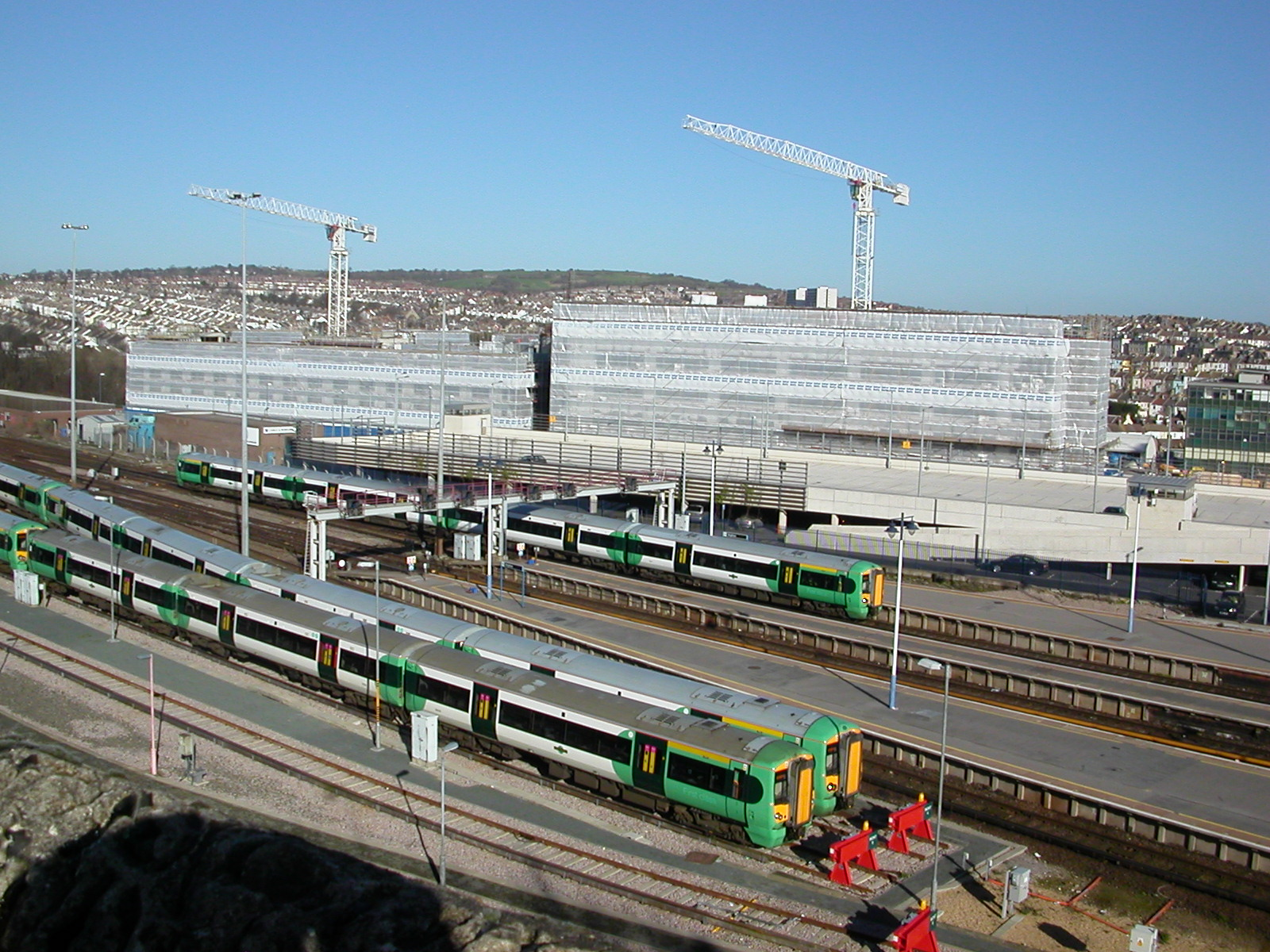
Study Group buildings under construction

The Black and Minority Ethnic Community Partnership, a grant-aided registered charity, leases the ground and first floors of Block D from Sainsbury's. The space is used as a community training and resource centre.

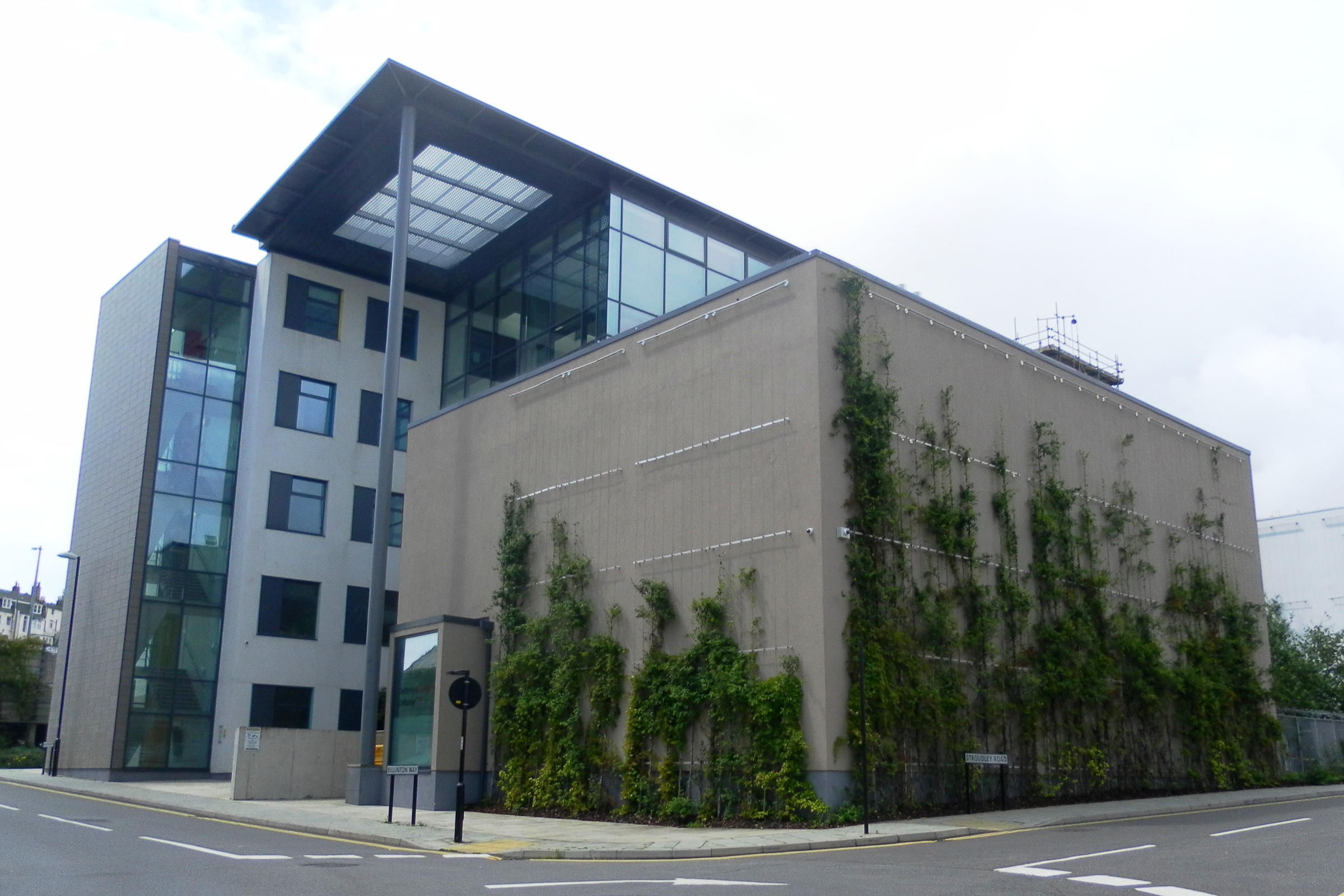
Bellerbys College building in 2012

Block F will be mostly allocated to community use. This area originally had a collection of old buildings which had originally been part of the locomotive works. Subsequently, they had been put to various uses, such as a camping goods shop and a furniture outlet. A third building, behind these shops, was believed to have been used as a "clocking-on" point for employees at the works, who would go there to register their presence each day before starting work. By 2002, it consisted mostly of a series of staircases, bridges and ramps, and was in poor condition.

Blocks L and M (total ground space 5,509 square metres (59,300 sq ft)) consist of accommodation for Study Group International, housing Bellerbys College, a preparatory college for foreign students intending to go to British universities; Embassy CES, a language school; Study Group head offices; and residential accommodation for students. The buildings contain four floors of teaching space, including 62 classrooms, a library and a bookshop (total area 4,336 square metres (46,670 sq ft)); five floors of accommodation (7,046 square metres (75,840 sq ft)) for approximately 375 students; a canteen and catering area (701 square metres (7,550 sq ft)); and offices and college administration space (1,965 square metres (21,150 sq ft)). There are 60 car parking spaces available beneath Block L for staff. The two blocks are connected by an enclosed glass walkway. An early version of the master plan showed three separate buildings on the site; the third, "Block N", was incorporated within the Block M building instead at the request of the college.

== Car parking ==
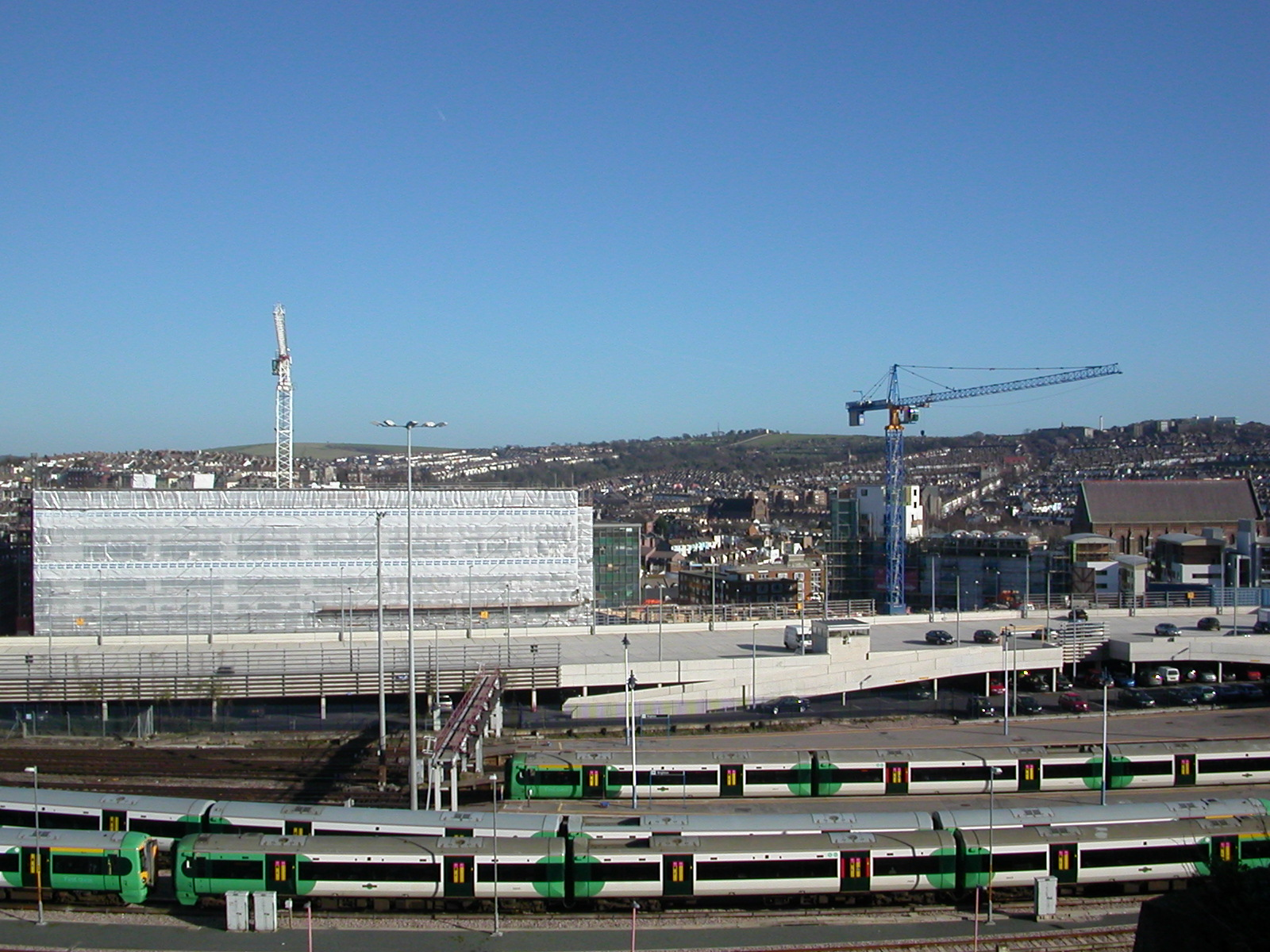
Looking over the Brighton Main Line towards the site of the former locomotive works. Left to right: Blocks L and M (under sheeting); the new station car park; Blocks E and F (beneath the blue crane)

Blocks O–R of the development make up Brighton station car park. This has two decks, a ground area of 8,884 square metres (95,630 sq ft) and 600 spaces, of which 26 are for disabled drivers. A pick-up and drop-off point with motorcycle parking and a turning circle is situated between the car park and the side entrance to the station. This was the first part of the New England Quarter to be completed; most of the work was undertaken by the Adenstar Construction Group, based in nearby Portslade. There was a contractual obligation to provide 600 spaces, although the form which this had to take was not specified and various proposals were considered, including a taller multi-storey structure with more floors and a much smaller ground area. During the construction works, a temporary car park was provided on land nearby.

There is relatively little parking elsewhere on the site, other than the 190-space facility at the Sainsbury's supermarket; this is partly mitigated by the retention of the London Road multi-storey car park, located between Block C and the A23 London Road itself. The residential areas in particular have very few dedicated parking spaces. Block K will have 27 spaces to be shared between the hotel and the office building; nine of these will be for disabled drivers. The master plan proposed 34 (including five on-street spaces), all of which were allocated to the office building.

== Changes to the road layout ==
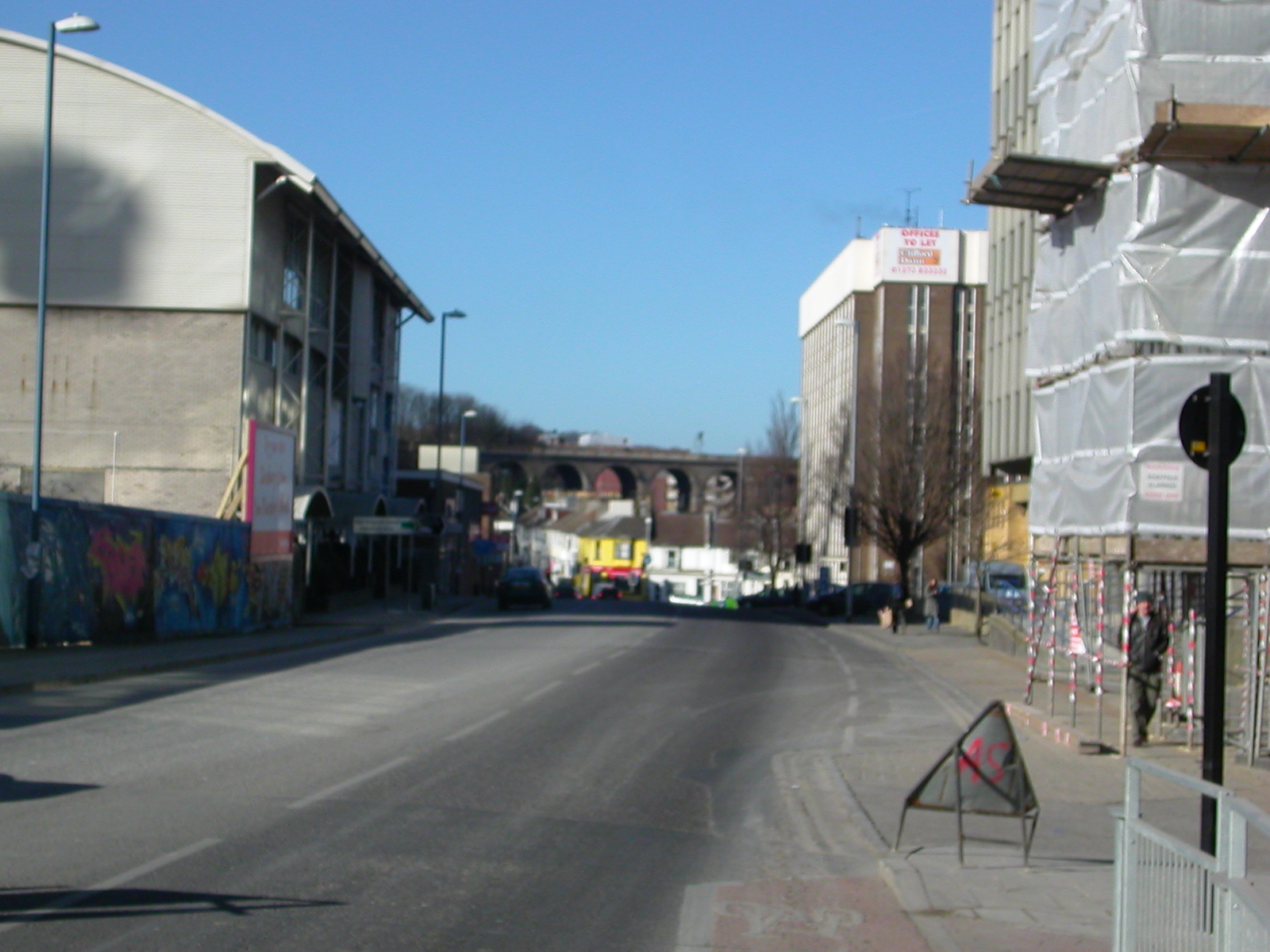
Northward view along the section of New England Street that has been retained as part of the north–south through route

Significant alterations have been made to the underlying road network in the area. Some roads have been downgraded, others are now expected to handle more traffic, and several new routes have been built. New pedestrian links and cycle paths have also been created.

The largest change has been the downgrading of the former through route of New England Street in favour of a new north–south road, Fleet Street, which diverges to the west. This has allowed a large part of New England Street to be narrowed, pedestrianised and provided with cycle lanes. In contrast, Cheapside is expected to take a much higher volume of traffic, as it becomes the main east–west route in the New England Quarter, taking traffic between London Road and Fleet Street, the main north–south road. Two new roads, Stroudley Road and Billinton Road, have been built to the west of the new Fleet Street, between there and the railway line. These give access to the car park, Bellerbys College and a new pick-up and drop-off point immediately outside the side entrance to the station. Two new pedestrianised squares—Ann Square and New England Square—have also been created within the core site.

== Transport ==
Some bus routes serve the New England Quarter. There are stops at various locations on Cheapside, Fleet Street and New England Street. As of September 2012, the following services operate:

- Route 21, operated by Brighton & Hove Buses, runs every 20 minutes (hourly on Sundays) from Brighton Marina via Whitehawk to the rear entrance of Brighton station in Stroudley Road.
- Route 37B, operated by Compass Travel, runs hourly from the Bristol Estate near Kemptown to the Meadowview area of Bevendean.
- Route 38, operated by Brighton & Hove Buses, runs every 30 minutes from Meadowview to the rear entrance of Brighton station.

The area is close to many other bus routes, both from outside the front entrance of Brighton station and along London Road. There is a direct pedestrian and vehicular route along Stroudley Road to the rear entrance of Brighton station.

== Environmental issues ==
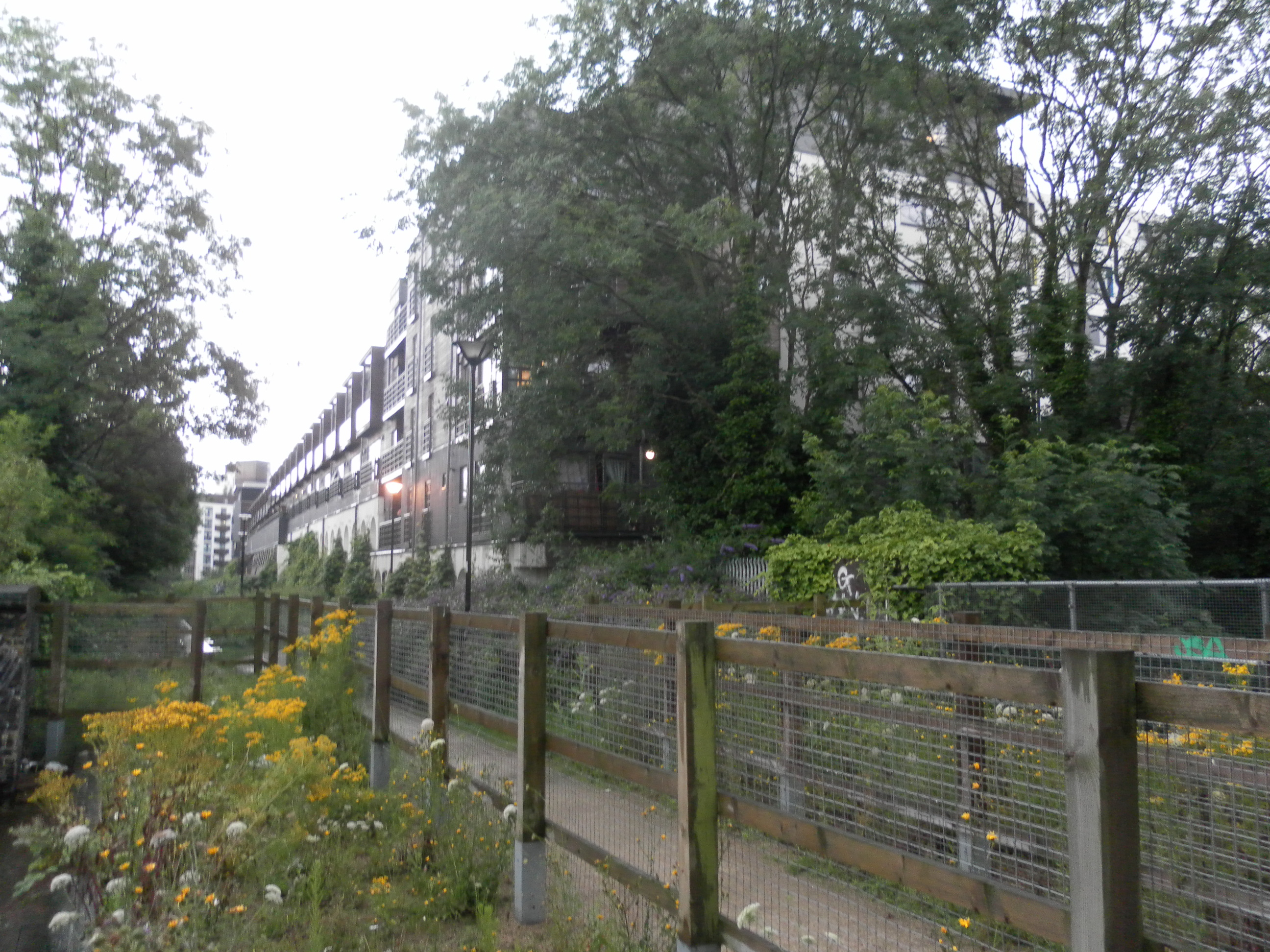
The "Greenway" green corridor runs below and to the east of the houses of Block G.

Part of the site, below and to the east of Block G, consists of a stretch of disused railway track which has for some time been designated a Site of Special Nature Conservation Importance (SNCI). This is defined as a "locally important site of nature conservation adopted by local authorities for planning purposes". This will be maintained and improved to create a "green corridor" called the Greenway, which will run from the embankment overlooking New England Road, at the northernmost point of the site (beyond Blocks L and M), through to the station. The northern section, which is already partly wooded and home to a variety of wildlife, will be maintained in this condition.

The housing developed by the Crest Nicholson/BioRegional Quintain joint venture is intended to encourage environmentally friendly, sustainable lifestyles, based on lessons learnt from the award-winning BedZED development in Wallington, south London. This was developed by the Peabody Trust in partnership with BioRegional Development Group. Proposals include "green lifestyle" packs and information for residents, solar panels, a communal wood-burning boiler to heat the apartments and provide hot water, solar-powered recharging point for electric cars, roof-mounted wind turbines, a community allotment/garden irrigated by rainwater from the roof, a car club, and a high proportion of recycled materials used in construction.

== Criticism and controversy ==
Various groups have expressed reservations about, and criticisms of, parts of the New England Quarter development or the scheme as a whole. Two aspects have been particularly controversial: the planning application for a 42-storey tower on the Block J site, which was refused but has been appealed against; and the Sainsbury's supermarket.

=== BUDD ===
Brighton Urban Design & Development (BUDD) is a campaign group which was set up in February 1997 in response to the original planning application for a Sainsbury's superstore and car park on what is now the New England Quarter site. Although initially created to oppose and protest against these original plans, it has subsequently developed into an all-encompassing point of contact for all issues relating to the New England Quarter, and its stated aim is now to "stimulate, encourage and initiate sustainable urban design and development through an inclusive participatory process, to combat social exclusion and to generate schemes that integrate social, cultural and environmental benefits to Brighton and Hove." In 1999, Brighton & Hove Council awarded the group a grant which enabled it to register as an industrial and provident society, noting that it was providing a significant community benefit by "providing a process for disparate communities of interest to develop their views and become involved in the planning and decision-making process".

BUDD held a public meeting was on 24 July 1997, at which 99% of the approximately 300 people who attended voted against the original planning application, which had been submitted in May following several months of preparation. A 4,317-name petition to the same effect was submitted to the council three months later. Marches and rallies also took place.

After the new master plan was submitted and approved, further action was taken by protestors; this was focused on the Harvest Forestry building at the corner of New England Street and Cheapside, which was squatted for a time.

=== SchNEWS ===
SchNEWS, a weekly anarchist newsletter, has frequently been critical of the plans for the New England Quarter site, and has regularly advertised BUDD's public meetings, protest events and similar. In April 2002, a demonstration was organised outside the Sainsbury's store in London Road.

=== Block J proposals ===
The original master plan granted outline planning permission for a 250-bed hotel of five to six storeys in height. However, property development and investment company The Beetham Organization Ltd, which has in recent years built several high-profile hotels, offices and other buildings in prominent city-centre locations in Britain, bought Block J in November 2004 and submitted a revised planning application (BH2005/00136/FP) early in 2005. This sought approval for a mixed-use development comprising one 42-storey building with 146 residential units (C3-category) and a hotel with ancillary facilities including a restaurant, cafés, conference facilities and a health and fitness centre; one six-storey building with retail units (A1- and A3-category) and a further 25 residential units; and a pedestrianised public square. The application was rejected on 20 separate counts, including the negative visual impact on surrounding listed buildings such as the railway station and St Bartholomew's Church; the reduction in quality of surrounding public spaces; the lack of provision of outdoor recreation space; negative effect on the surrounding microclimate, and loss of sunlight to nearby buildings; and the failure to consider fully the impact on transport. The reasons for the rejection were supported by various people and groups within the city, such as The Regency Society, which is involved with planning and conservation matters in Brighton and Hove.

== See also ==
- Buildings and architecture of Brighton and Hove
