= IKB Deutsche Industriebank =

German bank

IKB Deutsche Industriebank AG
- Type: Public (FWB: IKBG)
- Industry: Financial services
- Founded: 1924
- Defunct: 1974
- Headquarters: Düsseldorf, Germany
- Key people: Dr. Michael H. Wiedmann (CEO and Chairman of the Management Board), Dr. Karl-Gerhard Eick (Chairman of the Supervisory Board)
- Products: Corporate and Structured financing, Private Equity
- Net income: €221 million (1 January 2021 to 31 December 2021)
- Total assets: €14.3 billion (31 December 2025)
- Number of employees: 548 (31 December 2021)
- Parent: Crédit Agricole
- Website: www.ikb.de

IKB Deutsche Industriebank AG (FWB: IKBG) is a bank headquartered in Düsseldorf, Germany. It was established in 1924 under the name Bank für Industrie-Obligationen (lit. 'Bank for Industrial Bonds'). IKB supports medium-sized enterprises in Germany and Europe with loans, risk management, capital market services and advisory services. The online offering for retail banking customers covers overnight and term money, bank savings schemes, bank deposits and selected commercial papers. The bank has six branches in Germany. Single shareholder from 2008 to 2026 was the investment company Lone Star. In October 2026, an agreement regarding the acquisition by Crédit Agricole was announced.

== Corporation ==
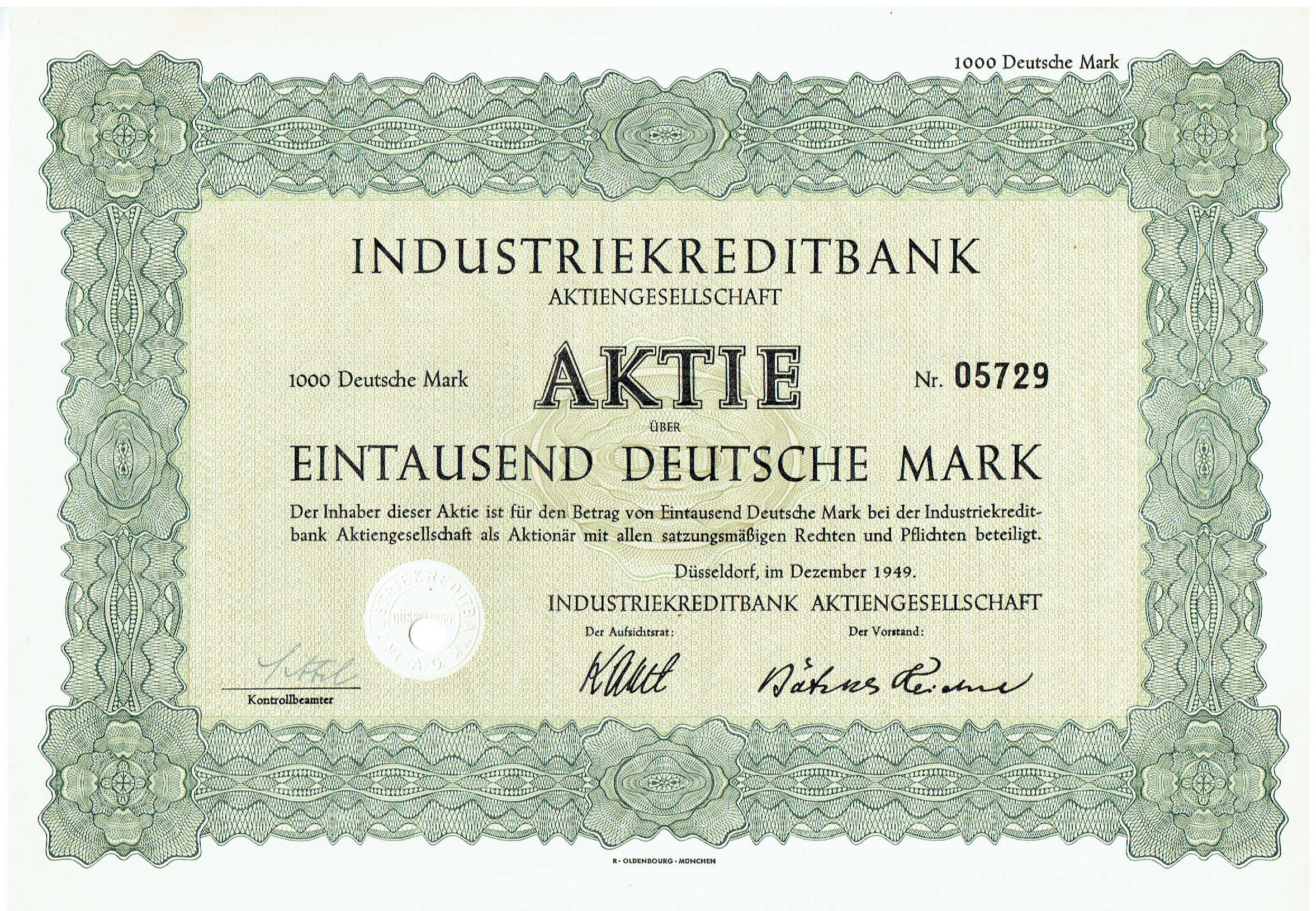
Share of the Industriekreditbank AG, issued in December 1949

IKB (Industriekreditbank) was granted its banking license in 1924 as "Bafio" (Bank für deutsche Industrieobligationen, Bank for German Industry Obligations). Bafio dealt in long-term real estate financing in an effort to aid the German economy grow under the weight of the World War I reparations the country owed.

The bank was incorporated under Germany's stock law (Aktiengesetz) in 1945. In 1974 it merged with Deutsche Industriebank to become IKB Deutsche Industriebank.

IKB's main area of business is financing for small and medium enterprises in Germany. In addition to corporate financing, they also undertake real estate financing.

The German government's financing bank, KfW (formerly Kreditanstalt für Wiederaufbau), owned a 38% stake in IKB. After several months of consideration of the sale of the IKB stake, it was announced on 21 August 2008 that private equity firm Lone Star Funds would acquire a 90.8% holding in the bank. The sale process of KfW's shares to Lone Star Funds was closed on 29 October 2008.

== 2007 subprime crisis ==
=== Losses ===
When the subprime market in the United States crashed in the summer of 2007, the global reach of the crisis was not immediately obvious. Several European banks, however, became victims of the crisis due to investment history; IKB was among the first European bank to declare financial trouble due to the subprime disaster.

In July 2007, IKB announced that it had been affected by the subprime mortgage financial crisis in the United States. Only a week earlier the bank had released a statement saying it expected to meet its earnings goals for the year. "Rhinebridge", a structured vehicle operated by IKB, had invested heavily in the U.S. subprime market.

To control the effects of the crisis in Germany, KfW, along with numerous commercial and coop banks (including Deutsche Bank and Commerzbank), formed a rescue fund to bail out the group. The funds used to bail out the bank amounted to €3.5 billion. Although IKB's stocks fell drastically, the bank avoided default, and the rescue is credited with having spared the German economy drastic fallout from the subprime crisis.

In February 2008, the German government announced that IKB would require another rescue package to remain liquid, largely because peer banks were reluctant to invest further in the bank. The rescue package was announced in mid February at an amount of €1.5 billion. As a result of the losses suffered by IKB, the company was demoted from Deutsche Börse's mid-cap MDAX stock market index to the small-cap SDAX in March 2008.

=== Investigations and controversy ===
==== Misconduct investigation by the Federal Republic of Germany ====
After the crash of its shares, the German financial watchdog BaFin and the Ministry of Finance opened an investigation into allegations of reporting and accounting misconduct. Although no charges were brought against the bank, four of the five executives of IKB stepped down between 1 August and 1 November 2007.

==== State aid investigation by the European Union ====
Shortly after the IKB crash, the European Union opened an investigation into the rescue package to determine if the package contravened its state aid regulations. After protracted talks with the EU, the German government submitted an official notification of the rescue measures and possible future restructuring measures in January 2008. As of February 2008, no ruling has been made by the European Court on the IKB case.

=== Goldman Sachs SEC lawsuit ===
IKB was mentioned by the U.S. Securities and Exchange Commission (SEC) in court fillings when it sued Goldman Sachs and one of Goldman's Collateralized debt obligation (CDO) traders on 16 April 2010. The SEC alleged that IKB was on the wrong side of the CDO instruments Goldman was creating and that Goldman defrauded both IKB and ABN AMRO in failing to disclose that the CDOs that IKB was purchasing were not assembled by a third party, but instead through the guidance of a hedge fund that was counterparty in the CDS transaction. This hedge fund, Paulson & Co., stood to earn great benefit in the event of default The suit by the SEC alleges that IKB lost $150 million which Paulson gained.

== Acquisition by Crédit Agricole (2026) ==
In October 2026, French lender Crédit Agricole announced the acquisition of IKB from Lone Star Funds.

== See also ==
- List of banks in the euro area
- List of banks in Germany
