= Taylors UniLink =

Coordinates: 37°48′47.13″S 144°57′35.67″E

- Melbourne, Victoria; Australia

Information
- Type: Private; Higher Education Diploma programs
- Principal: Tony Cranshaw (Melbourne)
- Campus: Urban, Parks
- Affiliations: Bond University, Charles Sturt University, Deakin University, Edith Cowan University, Flinders University, Griffith University, La Trobe University, Murdoch University, Swinburne University of Technology, The University of Newcastle, University of Wollongong, Queensland University of Technology, RMIT University, University of Technology Sydney
- Website: www.taylorsunilink.edu.au

Taylors UniLink was a private university located in the city of Melbourne, Australia, offering higher education diplomas.

Taylors UniLink was a business name of Study Group Australia Pty Limited which was a subsidiary of Study Group, a for-profit education provider. The accreditation of Study Group Australia Pty Limited was cancelled by the Australian Government effective 16 January 2019. Study Group’s registration to deliver vocational programs in Australia was cancelled by the Australian Skills Quality Authority (ASQA), citing a failure to provide necessary assessments and non-compliance with the VET Quality Framework.

== Partner Universities ==
Taylors UniLink had partnerships with fourteen universities across Australia.

- Bond University (CRICOS 00017B)
- Charles Sturt University (CRICOS 00005F NSW, 01947G VIC and 02960B ACT)
- Deakin University (CRICOS 00113B)
- Edith Cowan University (CRICOS 00279B)
- Flinders University (CRICOS 00114A)
- Griffith University (CRICOS 00233E)
- La Trobe University (CRICOS 00115M)
- Murdoch University (CRICOS 00125J)
- Queensland University of Technology (CRICOS 00213J)
- RMIT University (CRICOS 00122A)
- Swinburne University of Technology (CRICOS 00111D)
- University of Technology Sydney (CRICOS 00099F)
- The University of Newcastle (CRICOS 00109J)
- University of Wollongong (CRICOS 00102E)

== Campus Facilities ==
Taylors UniLink campus was located in Melbourne city, housed in a building and near the city center.
