= Bellerbys College =

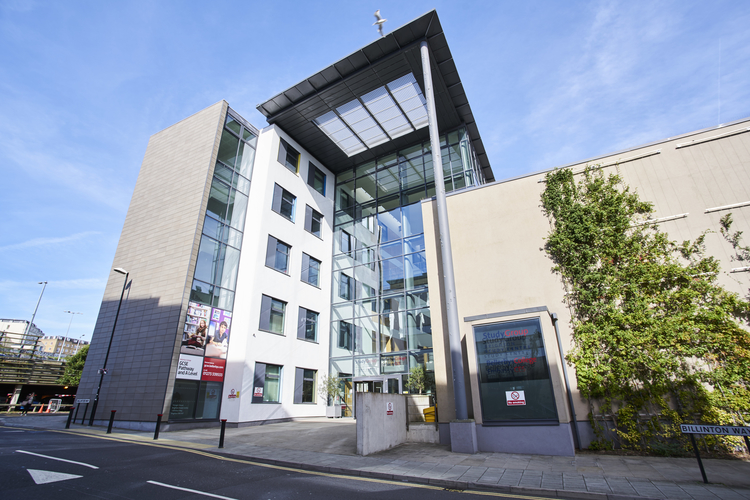
- Bellerbys College Brighton
- Brighton and London; United Kingdom

Information
- Type: Independent school
- Denomination: None
- Status: Closed
- Principal: Simon Mower
- Principal: Nicholas Waite
- Principal: Alison Baines
- Gender: Mixed
- Age range: 14–19
- Enrollment: Non-selective
- Website: www.bellerbys.com

Bellerbys College was a series of two (formerly four) private international co-educational boarding schools based in the UK, owned by Study Group. It offered students subject pathway courses. Its colleges closed in September 2022.

== Programmes ==
The college offered A-Level courses over six terms (2 years), five terms (1½ years) or three terms (1 year).

The college also offered a foundation programme in which students choose from one of numerous subject streams.

The Bellerbys College foundation programme was taught and examined to the same standards as A Levels, where applicable, and enabled students to prepare for entry into a specific field of study at university while also improving their English and study skills.

As of 2020 Bellerbys had a level 4 programme leading to direct entry to year 2 of an undergraduate programme at an NCUK university.

In 2021, Bellerby's announced a new partnership with Loughborough University that helps students receive conditional offers for specific degrees. The college had similar agreements with University of Bath and the University of Bristol.

== Location ==
Prior to full closure, the colleges were located in Brighton, Greenwich, and formerly Oxford and Cambridge.

== History ==
=== Founded ===
Bellerbys College dated back to Davies's College, founded in London in 1927. Davies's College was originally set up to prepare students for entrance to Oxford and Cambridge, the Armed Services and the Civil Service. A second branch of Davies's College was founded in Hove in 1959. Davies's Tutorial College in Hove as it was then called was based in premises at 44 Cromwell Road in Hove. The college was a tutorial college providing A-levels and A-Level re-sits mainly for British students.

In 1980 Mr Robin Bellerby became principal of Davies College in Hove and the college expanded to occupy neighbouring premises on Cromwell Road. At this time the college expanded its recruitment overseas and the college made links with the Jordanian government, leading to over 30 students from Jordan coming each year to study A Levels on government scholarships. Other students at the college came from Malaysia and Hong Kong.

Later the college was renamed Bellerbys College after the principal became the new owner. In 1991 the college was bought by a group of British businessmen who invested money in recruitment overseas and developed the foundation programme, a one-year bridging course enabling international students to enter UK universities at first-year undergraduate level.

The original Davies's College in London, which was located at 25 Old Gloucester Street, Queen Square, Bloomsbury, London, continued to operate independently of the college in Brighton until its closure in 1998.

=== Ownership ===
In 1994 the business together with the Embassy schools became British Study Group, later Study Group International, later to become owned by the Daily Mail Group before being sold on to the Australian Champ group.

On July 1, 2010, Providence Equity Partners took ownership of Study Group and in February 2019, Ardian, a private investment house, announced that it had acquired a majority stake in Study Group.

=== Growth ===
In 1996 Bellerbys opened a campus in the north of Cambridge and the following year took over a school in Wadhurst, East Sussex, expanding to cater to growing demand for British education overseas. Then in 1998 a London centre opened on the campus of the Roehampton Institute, University of Surrey (later Roehampton University). The college was based in Downshire House, a grade II Listed building in Roehampton, for four years until moving to custom-built premises, Bounty House, in Greenwich. Bellerbys Cambridge added its Queens Campus in 1999 and an Oxford campus opened on Broad Street in 2002.

=== Rape ===
In January 2011, an 18-year-old Malaysian Bellerbys girl student was gang raped at the school's Bounty House halls of residence following a disco at its nearby Greenwich campus. The four perpetrators, three of whom were the sons of Russian oligarchs, were all fellow students at the college; they were sentenced to a total of thirty-five years in prison.

=== Teacher "struck off" ===
In 2015, a biology teacher at Bellerbys' Cambridge site was banned from teaching for an indefinite period after kissing a student on the lips in a "sexually motivated" manner.

=== Closure ===
Bellerbys College closed their Cambridge campus on 31 August 2020. In September 2022, Bellerbys College closed in its entirety.

== Ofsted boarding inspections ==
=== Brighton ===
An Ofsted inspection on 1 June 2009 resulted in a report which found "the organisation is inadequate" and "the overall quality rating is inadequate"; this was as a result of "inadequate provision" in the key areas of "helping children to be healthy" and "protecting children from harm or neglect and helping them stay safe". Ofsted's latest inspection, conducted in March 2013, found the boarding provision to be 'good'.

An Ofsted inspection on 22 March 2013 resulted in a report which found that the school met the national minimum standards for boarding schools.

An Ofsted Inspection in September 2018 saw Bellerbys Brighton achieve top marks being fully compliant in all areas.

=== Cambridge ===
In an Ofsted report in May 2014 the Cambridge school was criticised for inconsistency in the application of recruitment practices; not fully implementing healthcare policies; a lack of communal space and lacking in both number and training of residential staff.

Ofsted's boarding report, published in June 2014 following an inspection the previous month at Bellerbys' Cambridge site, concluded that: "The school does not meet the national minimum standards for boarding". The inspectors found that overall effectiveness was "inadequate" including in the areas of "quality of boarding provision and care", "boarders' safety", and "leadership and management of boarding", writing: "Since the last inspection, the leadership and management of the college has failed to monitor the safety and welfare of students. The staffing arrangements for boarders lack pastoral care; residential staff are lacking in number and training in welfare matters".

However, they also noted that "The recent change in leadership is driving forward improvements and learning from inspection of fellow colleges. There is a commitment to build on strengths and tackle areas of weakness to improve the boarding experience for students". A follow-up re-inspection in November 2014, found that: "The school has made good progress and now meets all the national minimum standards for boarding schools".

=== Greenwich ===
Following the death of a boarder at Bellerbys' Bounty House residential facility in Greenwich in January 2014, Ofsted carried out an emergency inspection at the request of the Department for Education (DfE). The inspectors' report, published in March 2014, concluded that with one exception "all other national minimum standards looked at were not met". Failings identified in the emergency inspection report included: "The arrangements for child protection are ineffective [...] the risk assessment process is not robust [...] boarding staff are not appropriately supervised and managed [and] they are not appropriately trained [and that] the arrangements for recording and monitoring of required boarding records are poor […] For example, the incident log is not appropriately maintained; it does not include a record of the two recent serious incidents".

Ofsted re-inspected Bounty House in May 2014; the subsequent progress monitoring inspection boarding report found that: "The school has made good progress and now meets all the national minimum standards for boarding schools".

The most recent ISI inspection report (October 2019), stated that Bellerbys London was "100% compliant across all areas of the Focused Compliance Inspection and to meet all standards in the schedule to the Education Regulations 2014, the National Minimum Standards for Boarding Schools 2015, and associated requirements." In addition, Bellerbys London was judged "Excellent" in the area of the quality of students' Personal Development and "Good" in the area of the quality of students' Academic and Other Achievements.

=== Oxford ===
Ofsted inspected Bellerbys College, Oxford in March 2014 and found its boarding provision to be inadequate, concluding that "The school does not meet the national minimum standards for boarding". A progress monitoring inspection boarding report published in December 2014, following a re-inspection the previous month, found that "senior leaders have shown commitment to improve the safeguarding arrangements. The college has made good progress in implementing its action plan to ensure that all the national minimum standards are now met".

In November 2014 the Ofsted Welfare Inspection concluded the school meets the national minimum standards for boarding schools. The report highlighted the commitment of staff to improving safeguarding arrangements following a report in March 2014 that found boarding provision to be inadequate.

The Oxford college closed in 2017, with students and staff moving to other Bellerbys colleges.

== Marketing claims ==
In 2004, Bellerbys Colleges told undercover reporters from the Sunday Times that it could guarantee good university places to students completing its courses. In March 2015, Private Eye reported that marketing in Singapore was still claiming "successful completion of Bellerbys Foundation program guarantees you a place at one of our 50 partner universities". When Private Eye contacted Durham University, first on the list of Bellerbys' supposed UK partners, the university said it has never offered any such guarantee adding: "We have previously been in touch with Bellerbys to clarify this fact and to provide guidelines for using our name and logo in their marketing materials. We were not consulted on the Singapore website, which is misleading. We have contacted Bellerbys to ask for the wording … to be changed immediately".

== Accreditation ==
Bellerbys College was accredited by the British Accreditation Council (BAC) for Independent Further and Higher Education and was on the UK Register of Independent Schools. In 2006 the college in Cambridge won 5 Good Schools Guide Awards for A-Level results, and won a further 12 awards in 2008 and 2009 combined.
