= Study Group =

For-profit education provider

- Industry: For-profit education
- Founded: 1994; 32 years ago
- Headquarters: London, United Kingdom
- Key people: Ian Crichton (CEO)
- Parent: Ardian
- Website: studygroup.com

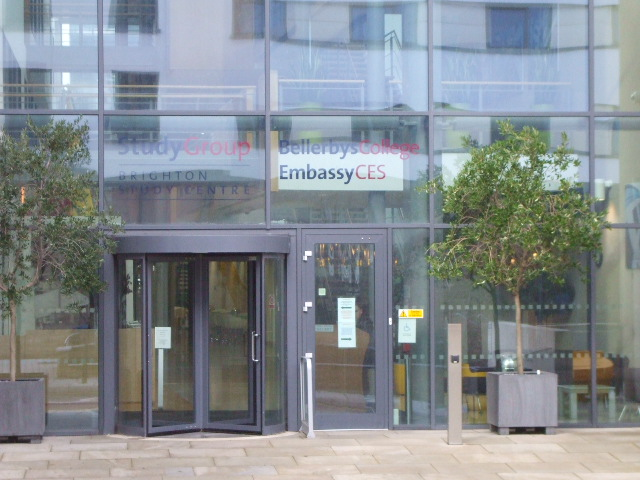
Study Group's secondary school and UK office in the New England Quarter, Brighton.

Study Group is a for-profit education provider that prepares international students for university degree programmes and offers English language courses.

Study Group operates International Study Centres with its partner universities across the United Kingdom and Ireland. These Study Centres provide pathway and foundation courses developed with universities focused on preparation for study at undergraduate and postgraduate degree level. Study Group also supports international students pursuing a global education in North America and Asia, with partner universities in the United States and China. The company also works with over 3,000 agents worldwide.

Study Group is led by CEO Ian Crichton.

Study Group has a questionable reputation. Study Group is rated 2.1 out of 5 stars by TrustPilot.

Shady recruitment practices have been reported in the news in an article titled "Pile them high: how student recruiters make millions" in the Times. Additional reporting by the BBC notes that Study Group recruited students lacking basic educational standards.

In addition, in Australia, they inappropriately signed students up to vocational courses resulting in a notice of debt removal for affected students by the government.

== History ==
=== 1980s-1990s: Founding ===
Previously acquired by businessmen Andrew Colin and Duncan Greenland in 1989, the company dates the origin of Study Group as British Study Group, with centres in Hastings and Brighton, England. A second language school was opened in Hove shortly after. Colin had previously acquired Bellerbys College, a sixth-form college for international students and was later incorporated in 1994 by Colin and Greenland, adding a third shareholder/director John Collyer with the merger.

For its initial offerings in the United Kingdom, Study Group's international students on pathway programmes were taught at an "International Study Centre" in partner university premises before starting their degree courses. As of 2021, it also offers its own online pathway programme.

In 1996, 40% of the business was acquired by the Daily Mail Group, becoming Study Group International. The same year, it expanded to the United States and Australia.

=== 1999-2010: Acquisitions ===
In 1999, the Daily Mail Group paid an estimated GB£44 million to take over 100% ownership of Study Group. The company is now known as Study Group.

As part of its expansion to the United Kingdom and Australian operations, Study Group acquired the Center for English Studies (CES) chain of language schools in the United States and Canada, adding Boston, Fort Lauderdale, Los Angeles, New York, San Diego, San Francisco, Seattle and Vancouver to its fold. It was later renamed to Embassy CES, and then Embassy English. In November 2018, Embassy English was acquired by EC.

In 2006 Study Group was acquired by Australian private equity company CHAMP, having been sold by Daily Mail Group for A$176.4 million.

In 2007, the Brighton school and UK head office moved to purpose-built premises in the New England Quarter, next to Brighton station, costing an estimated GB£28 million.

On July 1, 2010, Providence Equity Partners took ownership of Study Group for $660 million Australian dollars.

=== 2011-2025: Recent years ===
The accreditation of Study Group Australia Pty Limited, including Taylors UniLink, was cancelled by the Australian Government effective 16 January 2019.

In February 2019, Ardian, a private investment house, announced that it had acquired a majority stake in Study Group.

In February 2020, Study Group acquired the learning experience platform insendi to help develop its online pathway program offering.

In 2022, Study Group closed its Brighton-based Bellerbys College, reflecting changing patterns of international student mobility, and in 2024 launched Bellerbys Global to provide Foundation programs for international students nearer to their home countries.

Teachers at Study Group owned Sheffield university have not received any pay raises in years

In May 2026, Study Group announced that it was acquired by Arete Education.

== Key people ==
Study Group is led by CEO Ian Crichton. Academic leadership is provided by Provost and Chief Academic Offices Professor Elena Rodriguez-Falcon a Fellow of the Royal Academy of Engineering who was herself an international student. The Study Group Academic Board is chaired by former Vice-Chancellor of the University of Sheffield and eminent physicist Professor Sir Keith Burnett.
