= Fox and Grapes, Birmingham =

Fox and Grapes
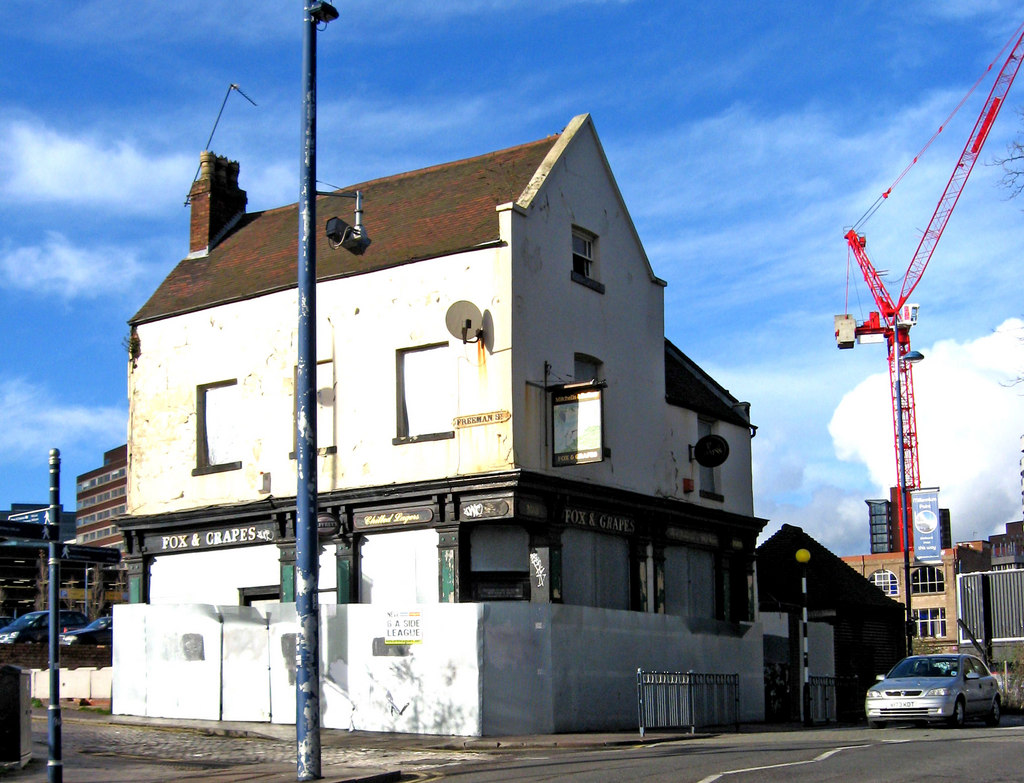
- The pub in February 2011, boarded up but with roof intact
- Interactive map of the Fox and Grapes area

General information
- Type: Public house
- Location: 16 Freeman Street, Digbeth, Birmingham, England
- Coordinates: 52.479672°N 1.890675°W
- Opened: 1823 or earlier
- Demolished: 15-16 September 2018

Technical details
- Material: Brick; stucco; slate roof

Design and construction
- Designations: Grade II listed

The Fox and Grapes was a historic, heritage-designated public house in the Digbeth area of Birmingham, England. After some time derelict, and a major fire, it was demolished in 2018.

== History ==
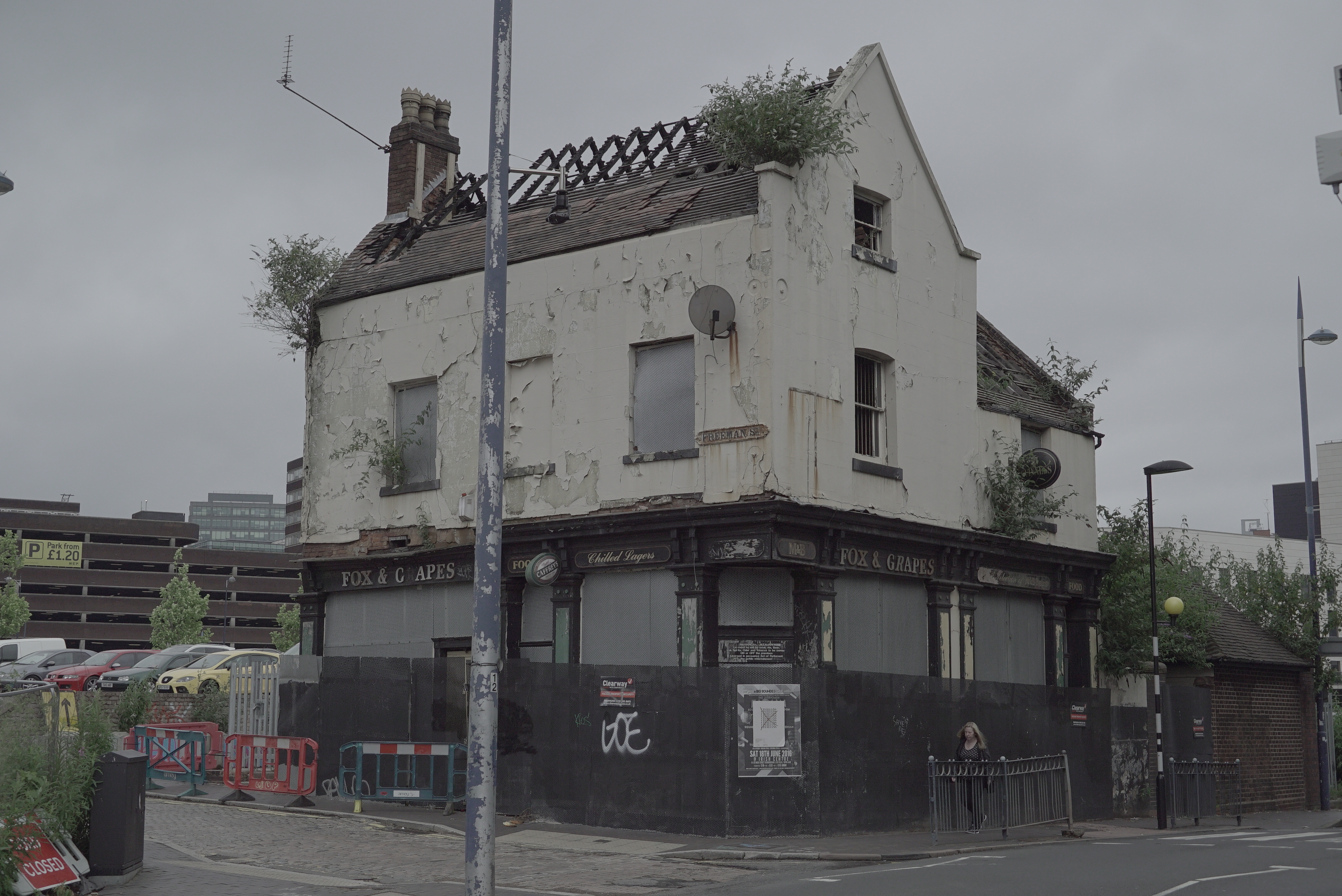
The derelict pub in July 2016 – note missing roof

Parts of the building dated from the late 17th or early 18th century. A public house had stood on the site, at 16 Freeman Street, on the corner of in Park Street, since at least 1829, and possibly as early as 1815. The name "Fox and Grapes", which refers to one of Aesop's Fables, The Fox and the Grapes, was in use by 1849. The facade was remodelled in the mid-19th century.

The pub was owned by Smiths Brewery, until taken over by Butlers (later Mitchell & Butlers), in 1957.

One wing of the stuccoed brick building, which had a tiled roof, included a former coach house. The already-derelict building was badly damaged by fire on the afternoon of 3 January 2015 – an incident which was attended by eight fire appliances from the West Midlands Fire Service.

The building was given grade II listed status in July 1982, legally protecting it from unauthorised alteration or demolition. Despite this designation, the building was demolished overnight on Saturday 15–16 September 2018. The demolition was strongly criticised by a city historian, Professor Carl Chinn, who described the act as being "as mystifying as it is upsetting and disgusting".

Birmingham City Council said that the demolition was "part of the HS2 Curzon Street Station development", referring to construction of the northern terminus of phase one of the High Speed 2 railway, nearby, and citing "structural issues" identified by "HS2's surveyors".

The building was very near to the site of Island House, which was demolished controversially in 2012.
