= Lone Star Funds =

American private equity firm

Lone Star Global Acquisitions, Ltd.
- Type: Private
- Industry: Private equity
- Founded: 1995; 31 years ago
- Founder: John Grayken
- Headquarters: London, England United Kingdom
- Key people: John Grayken (Founder & Chairman); Donald Quintin (Chief executive officer & Global President)
- Products: Private equity, real estate, credit
- AUM: $95 billion (2024)
- Website: www.lonestarfunds.com

Lone Star Funds, legal name of main entity Lone Star Global Acquisitions, Ltd. is a global private equity firm that invests in corporate equity, real estate, credit, and other financial assets. The founder of Lone Star established its first fund in 1995 (under a different name) and Lone Star has to date organized 25 private equity funds with total capital commitments since inception of over $95 billion (as of 2024). Lone Star's investors include corporate and public pension funds, sovereign wealth funds, university endowments, foundations, fund of funds and high-net-worth individuals. Lone Star Funds has affiliate offices in North America, Europe and Japan.

Hudson Advisors LP, an approximately 900-person global asset management company owned and controlled by the founder of Lone Star, performs due diligence and analysis, asset management and related services for Lone Star Funds. In this capacity, Hudson Advisors LP has managed in excess of $260 billion of assets for Lone Star Funds since inception.

== History ==
Lone Star was founded by John Grayken. From 1993 to 1995, Mr. Grayken was chairman and CEO of Brazos Partners L.P., a joint venture between the Robert M. Bass Group and the Federal Deposit Insurance Corporation, that resolved approximately 1,300 “bad bank” assets resulting from the U.S. savings and loan crisis in the early ‘90s. During this period, Brazos Advisors LLC was formed to provide asset-management and related services to Brazos Partners.

Following Brazos Partners, Grayken organized institutional capital to continue investing in distressed assets, closing Brazos Fund, L.P. in 1995 with approximately $250 million of capital commitments.

Lone Star Opportunity Fund, L.P. followed in 1996, with approximately $396 million of capital commitments. At that time Brazos Advisors, LLC was renamed Hudson Advisors LLC.

After an expansion into Canada in 1995 and 1996, Grayken pursued the launch of a global platform for Lone Star in 1997. Since then, Lone Star has invested extensively in North America, Europe and East Asia. Lone Star invested primarily in East Asia, including Japan, Korea, Indonesia and Taiwan, following the 1997 Asian financial crisis. In the mid-2000s, following the establishment of the Eurozone, Lone Star increased its investment focus in Europe.

Through its credit affiliate, LStar Capital (officially LSC Film Corporation), the company entered the motion picture financing sector when they signed a $200 million deal with Sony Pictures in early 2014. The deal gives them a financial stake in nearly all of Sony's upcoming films. However, due to the poor box-office performance of Sony's movies, the two firms severed ties on July 17, 2017, two years before the deal was set to end.

In July 2015, Lone Star acquired the UK property investment and development company Quintain for £700 million.

In March 2017, the Portuguese Central Bank announced that Lone Star Funds will acquire 75% of third largest Portuguese bank, Novo Banco, in return for a capital injection of €1bn. The other 25% will be retained by the Portuguese bank's resolution fund. In October 2017 the deal was closed and Lone Star Funds started controlling 75% of Novo Banco.

In March 2026, it was announced that Lone Star was one of several private equity firms in the running to acquire Irish banker Permanent TSB (PTSB).

== Investments ==
Lone Star invests in a variety of asset classes, primarily asset-heavy and/or cash flowing opportunities in developed markets. Investments have included:

=== 2000–2009 ===
- In February 2001, Lone Star acquired Tokyo Sowa Bank in Japan for 40 billion yen and renamed it Tokyo Star Bank.
- In 2008, Lone Star purchased $30.6 billion worth of CDOs from Merrill Lynch for $6.7 billion.
- Lone Star bought IKB Deutsche Industriebank in August 2008.
- Following the bankruptcy of Lehman Brothers, Lone Star purchased $10 billion of the firm's non-performing and performing loans for less than $300 million.

=== 2010–2020 ===
- In February 2014, Lone Star purchased Coeur Defense for €1.35 billion.
- In June 2015 Lone Star bought Home Properties, for $7.6 billion.
- In 2015 bough Neinor Homes in Spain.
- Lone Star purchased Xella from PAI Partners and Goldman Sachs for €2.2 billion in December 2016.
- Ferguson plc sold the Stark Group to Lone Star for €1.03 billion in November 2017.
- In May 2018, Lone Star acquired Imerys's roof tiling business for €1 billion forming Edilians.
- In December 2020, Lone Star acquired McCarthy Stone for €647 million.

=== 2021–present ===
- In November 2021, Lone Star acquired a five-hotel portfolio from Host Hotels & Resorts for $551 million.
- In April 2022, Lone Star acquired SENQCIA, a building materials company in Japan, from The Carlyle Group.
- Stellex Capital Management and Carlyle sold Titan Acquisition Holdings, a ship repair services and marine fabrication company, to Lone Star in June 2023.
- In May 2024, Lone Star bought ERIKS, the Netherlands-based specialized industrial service provider.
- Lone Star acquired Carrier Global Corporation's commercial and residential fire business, Kidde, for $3 billion in December 2024.
- Nippon Paint bought the chemical manufacturer AOC from Lone Star for $4 billion; Lone Star had acquired the company in 2021.
- In November 2025, it was announced Lone Star had acquired from St. James's Place plc, a multi-asset real estate portfolio located around the South East of England and London for an undisclosed sum. The portfolio comprised 16 assets, including multi-let industrial, retail and office properties.
- In January 2026, Lone Star agreed to acquire Alliance Ground International, a North American airport ground handling and aviation services provider, through an affiliate of Lone Star Fund XII, L.P. Financial terms were not disclosed.

== Funds ==
The following list shows the company's various funds.

Fund	Vintage Year	Committed Capital
Lone Star Real Estate Fund VII	2024	$2.7B
Lone Star Fund XII	2023	$5.3B
Lone Star Residential Mortgage Fund III	2022	$657M
Lone Star Value-Add Fund II	2022	$619M
Lone Star Value-Add Fund I	2020	$759M
Lone Star Real Estate Fund VI	2019	$4.7B
Lone Star Residential Mortgage Fund II	2019	$761M
Lone Star Fund XI	2019	$8.1B
Lone Star Fund X	2017	$5.5B
Lone Star Real Estate Fund V	2016	$5.8B
Lone Star Real Estate Fund IV	2015	$5.8B
Lone Star Residential Mortgage Fund I	2015	$1.3B
Lone Star Fund IX	2014	$7.2B
Lone Star Real Estate Fund III	2013	$7.0B
Lone Star Fund VIII	2013	$5.1B
Lone Star Fund VII	2010	$4.6B
Lone Star Real Estate Fund II	2010	$5.5B
Lone Star Fund VI	2008	$7.5B
Lone Star Real Estate Fund	2008	$2.4B
Lone Star Fund V	2005	$5.1B
Lone Star Fund IV	2002	$4.2B
Lone Star Fund III	2000	$2.3B
Lone Star Fund II	1999	$1.2B
Lone Star Opportunity Fund	1997	$396M
Brazos Fund	1995	$250M
