= John Grayken =

Irish billionaire (born 1956)

- Born: John Patrick Grayken; June 1956 (age 70); Cohasset, Massachusetts, US
- Citizenship: United States (by birthplace, renounced), Republic of Ireland (1999)
- Education: University of Pennsylvania; Harvard Business School
- Occupations: Founder and chairman, Lone Star Funds
- Board member of: Lone Star Funds, Hudson Partners
- Spouse: Eilene Davidson
- Children: 4

John Patrick Grayken (born June 1956) is an American-born Irish billionaire financier, the founder and chairman of the private equity firm Lone Star Funds.

Forbes magazine ranked Grayken 424th in the list of World's Billionaires and listed his wealth as totaling $6.9 billion for 2024.

== Early life ==
John Patrick Grayken was born in June 1956, and was brought up in Cohasset, Massachusetts, a suburb of Boston. He received a BA degree in economics from the University of Pennsylvania, and an MBA from the Harvard Business School in 1982.

== Career ==
Grayken first worked at Morgan Stanley, before joining the RMB Realty Group, the real estate investment firm of Texas billionaire Robert Bass.

Grayken served as the managing general partner of the Brazos Fund, a vulture fund founded by Bass in 1995. The fund aimed to buy mortgage-related assets from the banking industry, including from the Resolution Trust Corporation. Bass contributed US$30 million to Brazos Fund's $250 million capital base, which enabled Grayken to pursue his first cross-border deal in Canada. In 1996, Brazos bought a pool of non-performing assets from the National Bank of Canada.

Grayken founded Lone Star, the successor to the Brazos Fund, in 1995.

In 1999, Grayken became an Irish citizen, "for tax purposes", renouncing his American citizenship.

== Philanthropy ==
In March 2017, Eilene and John Grayken gave a $25 million gift to the Boston Medical Center (BMC) to create the BMC Grayken Center for Addiction Medicine. The gift is the largest donation in BMC's history.

In April 2017, John P. Grayken gave a leadership gift to the Wharton School of the University of Pennsylvania to fund the Grayken Program in International Real Estate at the Wharton School.

In February 2019, Grayken and his wife made a $10 million gift to create the Grayken Center for Treatment at South Shore Health, a non-profit, charitable health system in southeastern Massachusetts offering outpatient treatment for substance use disorders. The Center also serves pregnant and postpartum women facing behavioral health disorders.

Grayken and his wife made a 2022 donation of £50 million to the Great Ormond Street Hospital, earmarking the funds for researching treatment of childhood illnesses.

== Personal life ==
Grayken divorced his first wife soon after he became a "tax refugee"; they reunited within a month of the final divorce decree, but divorced again six months later. Grayken later married actress Eilene Davidson in London, a British theatre producer and former actress. They have four children.

As of 2015, they owned Pyrford Court, Surrey, which features prominently in the 1976 movie, The Omen. Pyrford Court is a Grade II listed 15-bedroom house, built in 1910 for Rupert Guinness, 2nd Earl of Iveagh. As of 2017, they live in a $70 million home in Chelsea, London, purchased through a company in Bermuda.

In 2022, he was accused by the police in Delhi of criminal breach of trust, cheating, and criminal conspiracy. It is alleged that he personally became the beneficial owner of RattanIndia Finance, when he had told other shareholders that Lone Star Funds would do so. The police further claimed that the Reserve Bank of India had approved the ownership of RattanIndia Finance by Lone Star Funds, but had not approved Grayden's direct ownership as required under Indian law.
