= Home Properties =

- Industry: Real estate investment trust Apartments
- Predecessor: Home Leasing Corporation
- Founded: November 13, 1993; 32 years ago
- Founder: Nelson B. Leenhouts; Norman P. Leenhouts
- Fate: Acquired by Lone Star Funds and dissolved (2015)
- Headquarters: Rochester, New York
- Revenue: $0.671 billion (2014)
- Net income: $0.189 billion (2014)
- Total assets: $4.488 billion (2014)
- Total equity: $1.653 billion (2014)
- Number of employees: 1,200 (2014)

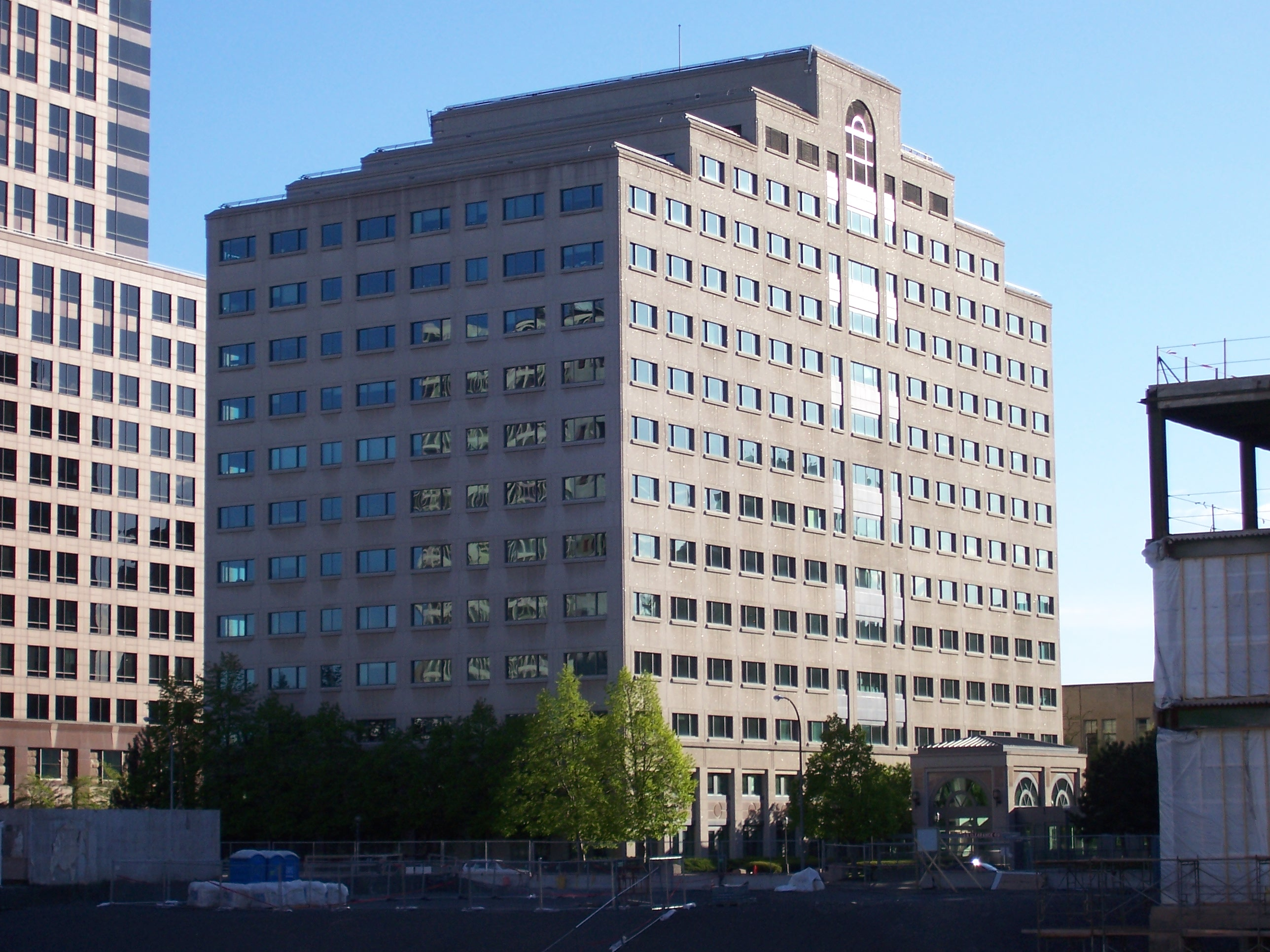
Former headquarters in downtown Rochester, New York

Home Properties was a real estate investment trust that invested in apartments. As of December 31, 2014, the company owned and operated 121 apartment complexes with 42,107 apartment units, all in Washington, D.C., Baltimore, Philadelphia, Long Island, Northern New Jersey, Boston, Chicago, and Florida.

The company was acquired in 2015 by private equity firm, Lone Star Funds.

== History ==
Home Properties dates back to Home Leasing Corporation, a company founded in 1967 by twin brothers Nelson and Norman Leenhouts.

Home Properties, Inc. was formed in 1993 and, on August 4, 1994, the company became a public company via an initial public offering.

On January 1, 2004, Edward J. Pettinella took over as president and CEO.

In October 2015, Lone Star Funds acquired the company in a $7.6 billion deal.
