= Quintain (company) =

Property investment and development organization

Quintain Limited
- Company type: Private
- Industry: Property
- Headquarters: London, England
- Key people: James Riddell, CEO
- Website: www.quintain.co.uk

Quintain is a British-based property investment and development business, which operates through Urban Regeneration, Mixed Use and Build to Rent in Wembley Park, with headquarters in London. Wembley Park now has over 5,000 homes and 3,650 are managed by Quintain Living for build to rent.

== History ==
The business was founded by Adrian Wyatt and Christopher Walls in 1992, and first listed on the London Stock Exchange in 1996. It acquired Fiscal Properties plc and Croydon Land & Estates Limited in 1997, English & Overseas Properties plc and Chesterfield Properties Limited in 1999, and Wembley (London) Limited, owners of the land around the stadium in Wembley, north London, in 2002.

At one stage, property investor Paul Kemsley invested heavily in the company. He then sold his shares to HBOS, which tried unsuccessfully to take over the company.

In July 2015, Quintain accepted a £700 million offer from Lone Star Funds. However, the deal had only been approved by 71.7% of the shareholders - short of the 75% required for the deal to go through. Activist hedge fund, Elliot Associates LP, took control of 12.9% of voting rights for Quintain. As a result of the pressure put on by the activist hedge fund, Lone Star Funds increased the buyout offer to £745 million. This represents a bid that is 10 pence higher than the previous. One of the intriguing parts of the buyout lies in Quintain's preapproval to build 5,000 houses surrounding Wembley Stadium - home to England's soccer team.

In 2019 James Saunders became CEO. In December 2025, Quintain appointed James Riddell as the new CEO: he joined the board in 2015 when Lone Star acquired Quintain, and has spent four years as chairman.
